= Line information database =

The line information database (LIDB) is a collection of commercial databases used in the United States and Canada by telephone companies to store and retrieve Calling Name Presentation (CNAM) data used for caller ID services. In Canada, it is common for the client to apply their own Caller ID information, and this is allowed (and common in PBXs), provided the regulations regarding spoofing and fraud are not violated. The databases map telephone numbers to 15-character strings of caller names. Class 5 telephone switches, which provide end-office services in exchange areas, use the Signaling System 7 (SS7) signaling protocol to query the database.

The data submitted to the Line Information Database is maintained by a customer's carrier, and most incumbent local exchange carriers (ILECs) like the Baby Bells, and competitive local exchange carriers (CLECs) provide access for customers. In addition, LIDB databases were available from Intelco, Neustar, TNS, Qwest, Sprint and Verisign in North America. Some carriers do not provide a database, and CNAM lookups are provided using alternate methods, aggregated data from other sources, such as social media.

In the US, caller ID name information is not transmitted from the originating office to the destination office. It is the terminating carrier that is responsible for providing the caller ID information to its customers. The carrier performs a database lookup using the caller's telephone number to obtain the name information for the caller ID service. If the data is with another carrier, then the terminating carrier must perform a lookup and pay a small dip fee to the carrier hosting the information. Wholesale rates for the fee are on the order of $200 to $600 per 100,000 lookups.

Per carrier policy, the name of a person or business may be automatically added to the Line Information Database and the customer must opt-out to remain anonymous. Other carriers exclude identity information by rule, and require the subscriber to opt-in. If the identity information is not available, then the maintainer of the database often returns geographic information, such as the city and state. In case of a failure, the maintainer of the database may also return "NOT AVAILABLE".

The CNAM databases are independent databases operated by LECs and other private companies. The called party's carrier has the responsibility to perform the CNAM lookup, and it is possible that lookups for the same telephone number from different locations return different name information.

== See also ==
- Local number portability
- Location Routing Number
- Dip fee fraud
