= Calling Name Presentation =

Functionality in phone networks

Caller Name Presentation (CNAP) or Caller Name Delivery (CNAM) is used in US-based telephone networks to provide name identification of the calling party. The CNAM information is most often displayed in Caller ID. The information could be the person's name or a company name. The caller's name can also be blocked and display “restricted”, or if technical failures occur “not available”.

In Canada, the caller name information can be applied either by the client's own equipment (PBX), or by the originating carrier. The altering of caller ID information is allowed, provided it does not violate regulations in place regarding spoofing or fraud.

In the US, the caller's name, or CNAM information, is not sent during a call. Rather, the terminating carrier is responsible for providing the Caller ID information to its customer. The terminating carrier performs a database lookup using the caller's phone number to obtain the name information to display with Caller ID. If the data is with another carrier, then the terminating carrier must perform a lookup and pay a small "dip fee" to the carrier hosting the information. Wholesale rates for the fee are on the order of $0.002 to $0.006 per database dip ($200 to $600 per 100,000 calls).

Incorrect Caller ID information can be displayed under a variety of circumstances. The customer's carrier may not perform the database lookup and may supply old information. Or, the customer's carrier may perform the database lookup but get incorrect information from the database owner. In this case, the database owner has stale information (and not the terminating carrier). Or, the Caller ID information may be spoofed.

Incumbent Local Exchange Carriers (ILEC) usually provide the most correct information. ILECs have a huge database of their own CNAM data, and ILECs are willing to pay the CNAM database dip fee to another ILEC or a Competitive Local Exchange Carrier (CLEC) to obtain the CNAM data.

== Relationship to branded calling and Rich Call Data ==
Traditional CNAM in the United States is generally a terminating-carrier lookup: the caller's telephone number is delivered with the call, and the called party's carrier may query a CNAM or Line Information Database to obtain the associated display name. CNAM records are commonly limited to short text strings, typically up to 15 characters.

Branded calling and Rich Call Data are separate approaches that can provide caller information beyond traditional CNAM. Rich Call Data can include information such as a caller name, logo, photo, or call reason in SIP signaling associated with the call. ATIS and SIP Forum specifications describe STIR/SHAKEN procedures for authentication, verification, and transport of calling name, images, logos, and call reason.

== Mobile carrier implementations ==
During the smartphone era, several North American wireless carriers introduced caller-identification services extending beyond traditional CNAM database lookups. These services integrated caller identity features directly into mobile handset software and carrier applications.

Cequint developed mobile caller-identification technologies deployed by multiple wireless carriers. Earlier products such as City ID displayed geographic information associated with incoming telephone numbers rather than caller names. Later services expanded to caller-name and spam-identification functionality.

Verizon Wireless offered a service called Caller Name ID, later incorporated into Verizon Call Filter. Verizon describes the service as providing spam alerts and displaying a name, picture, city, and state for incoming calls, texts, and voicemail messages from unknown numbers.

These systems differed from traditional CNAM implementations because they could incorporate cloud databases, spam analytics, handset software integration, and authenticated caller identity frameworks in addition to conventional terminating-carrier CNAM lookups.

== See also ==
- Caller ID
- Line Information Database
- Local number portability
- Location Routing Number
- Dip Fee Fraud
- Signalling System No. 7
