= Porting Authorisation Code =

Unique identifier

Porting Authorization Code (PAC) is a unique identifier (normally 9 characters long and in the format "ABC123456") used by some mobile network operators to facilitate mobile number portability (MNP). This allows users to retain their mobile telephone number when switching operators.

== United Kingdom ==
Telecommunications service is regulated in the UK by Ofcom. On 25 July 2003, Ofcom introduced the General Conditions of Entitlement which apply to all communications networks and service providers in the UK. Several amendments to this original document have been issued since this time.

Condition 18 requires all providers to provide number portability but only to subscribers of publicly available telephone services who request it. Number portability must be provided as soon as practicable and on reasonable terms to subscribers, and bilateral porting arrangements between providers must accord with agreed processes.

1. The current service provider must give the customer a Porting Authorisation Code (PAC), or a reason why it cannot be issued, within two working hours of their request (if for fewer than 26 numbers) or ten working days (for 26+ numbers)
2. A PAC is valid for a period of 30 calendar days from the day of issue, and the customer's request must be submitted to their new service provider within that time.
3. A number can then be transferred between 1 and 32 calendar days from the date the PAC is issued.

Some mobile phone companies can charge a fee to move the customer's number. This is usually no more than £25. The provider must issue a PAC within two hours of the port-out request, if such request was made over the phone for fewer than 25 numbers on a single account. Customer debt is not a valid reason for a service provider to refuse issuing of a PAC. Service providers may not treat PAC requests as requests to terminate service. Pay-as-you-go customers will lose any unused credit when switching service providers.

Since 1 July 2019, customers can request a PAC by text message, rather than having to call their existing network.

== India ==
In India, the code is known as a 'Unique Porting Code (UPC)'. The rules for number portability are prescribed by the Telecom Regulatory Authority of India (TRAI)

== See also ==
- Local number portability
- Migration Authorisation Code
