= ADSI =

ADSI may refer to:

- Superintendent (police), Acting Detective Superintendent
- Active Directory Service Interfaces, a technology introduced by Microsoft in the Windows 2000 Operating System
- Analog Display Services Interface, application used by many screen-based analog telephones to work with optional calling services
- American Defense Systems, Inc., provider of transparent and opaque armor, architectural hardening and security products
