= Cequint =

American telecoms software company

- Industry: Data communications
- Founded: 2004
- Fate: Acquired
- Successor: Transaction Network Services
- Headquarters: Seattle, Washington, United States
- Key people: Rick Hennessey; Scott Weller; Mark Gosselin; Hossein Mousavi; Jason Torrey; Ron Hume
- Website: Cequint official website at Wayback machine

Cequint was an American telecommunications software company known for developing mobile phone based caller identification (Caller ID) and Calling Name Presentation (CNAM) services for wireless carriers in North America.

The company initially developed City ID, a mobile caller identification application that displayed the city and state associated with incoming telephone numbers, and later developed enhanced caller name and spam-identification services for wireless carriers.

== History ==
Cequint was founded in Seattle in 2004.

In 2007, Alltel introduced Cequint's City ID service on selected mobile phones. The service displayed geographic information associated with incoming telephone numbers directly on mobile handsets.

Verizon Wireless later introduced City ID on supported devices including the LG Voyager.

In 2010, Transaction Network Services (TNS) agreed to acquire Cequint for approximately $50 million upfront with additional contingent consideration that could increase the transaction value to approximately $112.5 million.

In 2011, T-Mobile US launched Name ID, a Cequint-developed caller identification service for smartphones. Contemporary coverage described the service as one of the first large-scale wireless-carrier implementations of name-based caller identification for smartphones.

Sprint later deployed Cequint Enhanced Caller ID together with TNS Call Guardian anti-spam technology as part of Sprint Premium Caller ID. The service identified robocalls, spoofed calls, spam callers, and caller risk categories using real-time analytics.

Verizon Wireless later offered Caller Name ID features as part of its caller-identification and spam-protection services, eventually integrating those capabilities into Verizon Call Filter.

== Products ==
=== City ID ===
City ID was a mobile caller-identification service that displayed the city and state associated with an incoming telephone number.

The application was deployed by multiple North American wireless carriers including Alltel, AT&T, U.S. Cellular, and Verizon Wireless.

=== Name ID ===
Name ID was a smartphone caller-identification service introduced by T-Mobile USA in 2011.

The service displayed caller names, city, and state information for incoming calls from numbers not stored in a user's contacts database.

Name ID also incorporated spam detection and caller categorization features.

=== Enhanced Caller ID ===
Enhanced Caller ID was a later Cequint platform that expanded mobile caller identification beyond geographic information to include caller names, spam identification, fraud warnings, and caller categorization.

Sprint deployed the service as part of Sprint Premium Caller ID.

Verizon Wireless launched the service on the Galaxy S3, and all subsequent Android devices starting in 2012.

== Legacy ==
Cequint's products were part of a broader transition in wireless telecommunications from traditional Calling Name Presentation (CNAM) systems toward smartphone-integrated caller identity, spam analytics, and branded calling services.

These systems anticipated later Rich Call Data and branded-calling frameworks that incorporated caller authentication, logos, and additional metadata beyond conventional CNAM name delivery.

== See also ==
- Caller ID
- Calling Name Presentation
- STIR/SHAKEN
- Rich Call Data
- City ID
