= NPAC =

NPAC may stand for:

- News Photographers Association of Canada
- National Pain Advocacy Center
- Nocturnal post absorptive catabolism
- Northeast Parallel Architecture Center, Syracuse University
- North Point Alliance Church, Hong Kong
- Number Portability Administration Center, telecoms
- North Pacific accumulation zone
- North Pacific Arctic Conference
