= City ID =

Caller mobile identification service

- Developer: Cequint
- Operating system: Android, iOS BREW, BREW MP
- Platform: Mobile phones
- Type: Caller ID, Calling Name Presentation, mobile app
- License: Proprietary

City ID is Cequint's first-generation caller mobile identification service. City ID displays the city and state or country associated with the caller's telephone number. In partnership with mobile network operators, the City ID service is available on many devices from Alltel, AT&T, U.S. Cellular, and Verizon Wireless.

== Caller Information Operation ==
The City and State information is determined by referencing the area code and exchange (NPA-NXX) of the calling party's telephone number using a database stored locally on the mobile phone. This database is updated as new area codes and exchanges are introduced.

The City ID application is integrated into the firmware of mobile phones, providing city and state (or country) information to the phone application for native display on the incoming call screen, call logs, and outgoing call screen.

== History ==
Alltel introduced City ID in May 2007 on selected mobile phones, initially including the LG AX275. The application matched incoming numbers to the city and state where the number was registered and displayed that information with the incoming call.

Verizon Wireless introduced City ID in 2008, initially on the LG Voyager.

In 2010, Transaction Network Services agreed to acquire Cequint. Contemporary trade coverage described Cequint as a Seattle-based company offering caller ID products to mobile operators, with City ID as its initial product and a second-generation caller ID service under development that included caller-name delivery.

The city and state information provided by the City ID service is based on the area code and exchange in which the phone is registered. For land-line phones, this information is a reliable method for determining the phone's originating calling office or switch (the exchange). For mobile phones, this information is potentially less useful because mobile phones often operate outside of their originally registered area code and exchange area.

== Android Details ==
City ID is integrated on many Android devices in partnership with several mobile network operators. The service offers a 15-day free trial and then a subscription fee is required to continue the service. The software is pre-installed and, because it's integrated into the firmware, users cannot remove or disable it unless they have root privileges, (e.g. "rooted") their phone.

The Application Manager in the Settings application can be used to Force Stop the application.

According to Cequint:

The way to disable City ID is to select “No” at the end of the free trial, which ends 15 days after you receive the initial free trial notification. If you select “Remind Me Later,” or press the Back or End key (or a similar action) the trial expired message will appear after each incoming call (up to 10 times), so please be sure to select “No” upon the first expiration message to disable City ID.

== BREW Details ==
City ID is pre-installed on many BREW (and the successor OS, BREW MP) devices in partnership with several mobile network operators. BREW and BREWMP phones usually do not have obvious branding like Android and Blackberry phones. Cheaper feature phones in North America are most often BREW-based mobile phones.

The Media Center should allow removal of the pre-installed City ID application.

== See also ==
- Mobile Caller ID
- NANPA
- Rooting (Android OS)
