= Caller ID =

Service that sends phone caller's number to the recipient of the phone call

Caller ID system response sounds in various cases: analog (intervalless packet), ISDN and digital PBX

Caller identification (Caller ID) is a telephone service, available in analog and digital telephone systems, including voice over IP (VoIP), that transmits a caller's telephone number to the called party's telephone equipment when the call is being set up. The caller ID service may include the transmission of a name associated with the calling telephone number, in a service called Calling Name Presentation (CNAM). The service was first defined in 1993 in International Telecommunication Union – Telecommunication Standardization Sector (ITU-T) Recommendation Q.731.3.

The information received from the service is displayed on a telephone display screen, on a separately attached device, or on other displays, such as cable television sets when telephone and television service is provided by the same vendor. The customer has control as to whether one's full name or merely first initial appears.

Caller ID service, which is also known by similar terms such as CID, calling line identification (CLI, CLID), calling number delivery (CND), calling number identification (CNID), calling line identification presentation (CLIP), and call display, does not work with Centrex, a phone system widely used by corporations that allows outside callers to dial an extension without going through an operator.

The inverse feature, giving the number originally dialed, is known as direct inward dialing, direct dialing inward, or Dialed Number Identification Service. This tells the PBX where to route an incoming call, when there are more internal lines with external phone numbers than there are actual incoming lines in a large company or other organisation.

== Calling-line identification ==
In some countries, the terms caller display, calling line identification presentation (CLIP), call capture, or just calling line identity are used; call display is the predominant marketing name used in Canada (although some customers still refer to it colloquially as "caller ID"). The concept of calling number identification as a service for POTS subscribers originated from automatic number identification (ANI) as a part of toll free number service in the United States.

Caller ID and ANI are different and distinct services. ANI was originally a service in a non-electronic central office that identified the telephone number of the line from which a call was originated. In addition to the caller's telephone number, caller ID may also transmit the subscriber's name, when available. The name can be passed on by the originating central office, or it is obtained from a line information database by the terminating switch. If no name is available, the city, state, province, or other designation may be sent. Some of these databases may be shared among several companies, each paying every time a name is "extracted". It is for this reason that mobile telephone callers may appear as "WIRELESS CALLER", or the central office location of the number.

If the call originates on a POTS line (a standard loop-start line), then caller ID is provided by the service provider's local switch. Since the network does not connect the caller to the callee until the phone is answered, generally the caller ID signal cannot be altered by the caller. Most service providers, however, allow the caller to block caller ID presentation through the vertical service code *67.

A call placed behind a private branch exchange (PBX) has more options. In the typical telephony environment, a PBX connects to the local service provider through Primary Rate Interface (PRI) trunks. Generally, although not absolutely, the service provider simply passes whatever calling line ID appears on those PRI access trunks transparently across the public switched telephone network (PSTN). This opens up the opportunity for the PBX administrator to program whatever number they choose in their external phone number fields.

Some IP phone services (ITSPs, or Internet Telephony Service Providers) support PSTN gateway installations throughout the world. These gateways egress calls to the local calling area, thus avoiding long distance toll charges. ITSPs also allow a local user to have a number located in "foreign" exchange; the New York caller could have a Los Angeles number, for example. When that user places a call, the calling line ID would be that of a Los Angeles number, although they are actually located in New York. This allows a call return without having to incur long distance calling charges.

With cellphones, the biggest issue appears to be in the passing of calling line ID information through the network. Cellphone companies must support interconnecting trunks to a significant number of wireline and PSTN access carriers.

== CLI localisation ==
Calling line identity (CLI) localisation is the process of presenting a localised calling line identity to the recipient of a telephone call. CLI localisation is used by various organisations, including call centres, debt collectors and insurance companies. CLI localisation allows companies to increase their contact rate by increasing the chance that a called party will answer a phone call. Because a localised CLI is displayed on the called party's device, the call is perceived as local and recognisable to the caller rather than a withheld, unknown or premium rate number. The presented telephone number is adjusted depending on the area code of the dialed number.

In 2020, the Eastern District of Texas found a single missed call using a localized number was enough to trigger Article III standing under Telephone Consumer Protection Act (TCPA). The court reasoned, "At issue in this case is a missed call, not a single, unsolicited text message. It only takes one glance at a text message to recognize it is for an extended warranty for a car you have never owned or a cruise you have won from a raffle you never entered. A missed call with a familiar area code, on the other hand, is more difficult to immediately dismiss as an automated message."

== History ==
In 1968, Theodore George "Ted" Paraskevakos, while working in as a communications engineer for SITA in Athens, Greece, began developing a system to automatically identify a telephone caller to a call recipient. After several attempts and experiments, he developed the method in which the caller's number was transmitted to the receiver's device. This method was the basis for modern-day Caller ID technology. From 1969 through 1975, Paraskevakos was issued twenty separate patents related to automatic telephone line identification, and since they significantly predated all other similar patents, they appear as prior art in later United States patents issued to Kazuo Hashimoto and Carolyn A. Doughty.

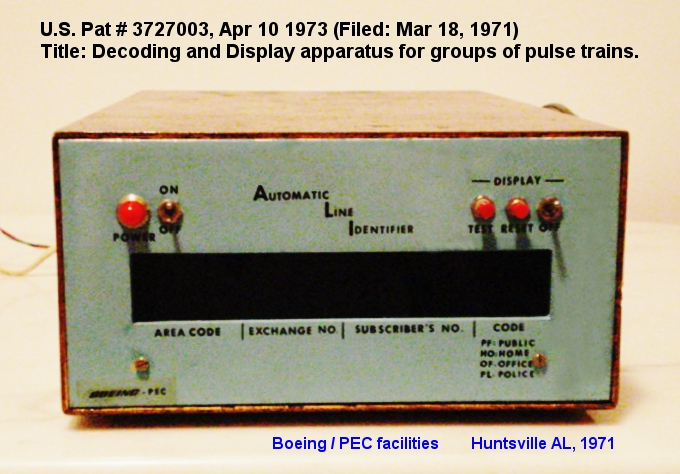
The first caller identification receiver

In 1971, Paraskevakos, working with Boeing in Huntsville, Alabama, constructed and reduced to practice a transmitter and receiver, representing the world's first prototypes of caller-identification devices. They were installed at Peoples' Telephone Company in Leesburg, Alabama, and were demonstrated to several telephone companies. These original and historic working models are still in the possession of Paraskevakos. In the patents related to these devices, Paraskevakos also proposed to send alphanumeric information, such as the caller's name, to the receiving apparatus and to make banking by telephone feasible. He also proposed to identify the calling telephone by special code; e.g., "PF" for public phone, "HO" for home phone, "OF" for office phone, "PL" for police.

In May 1976, Kazuo Hashimoto, a prolific Japanese inventor with over one thousand patents worldwide, first built a prototype of a caller ID display device that could receive caller ID information. His work on caller ID devices and early prototypes was received in the Smithsonian Institution, National Museum of American History in 2000. U.S. patent 4,242,539, filed originally on May 8, 1976, and a resulting patent re-examined at the patent office by AT&T, was successfully licensed to most of the major telecommunications and computer companies in the world.

Initially, the operating telephone companies wanted to have the caller ID function performed by the central office as a voice announcement and charged on a per-call basis. John Harris, an employee of Northern Telecom's telephone set manufacturing division in London, Ontario, promoted the idea of displaying caller ID on a telephone. The telephone was coded ECCS for Enhanced Custom Calling Services. A video of his prototype was used to leverage the feature from the central office to the telephone set.

In 1977, the Brazilian inventor Valdir Bravo Salinas filed a patent application for a caller ID device at the Brazilian Patent and Trademarks Office (INPI). The patent was issued in 1982 as patent PI7704466 and is the first patent issued for a caller ID equipment in Brazil. Later in 1980, two other Brazilian inventors, João da Cunha Doya and Nélio José Nicolai, filed patent applications for other caller ID devices. Doya’s application was filed on May 2, 1980 and issued as patent PI8003077. Nicolai’s application was filed on July 2, 1980 and rejected for being a copy of Salinas' invention. In 1981 another application for a caller ID equipment was filed at the INPI by José Daniel Martin Catoira and Afonso Feijó da Costa Ribeiro Neto. This application was granted and the patent issued as patent PI8106464.

The first market trial for Caller ID and other "Custom Local Area Signaling Services" (CLASS) was conducted by BellSouth in January 1984 in Orlando, FL after having been approached by Bell Labs (prior to AT&T's Divestiture on January 1, 1984) to conduct a trial. A press conference with ABC, NBC, CBS, and CNN was conducted announcing the event. The name Caller ID was decided by the BellSouth Product Team, purposely not trademarking the name so that other Telcos would be free to adopt the name for ubiquity. The other regional Bell operating companies later adopted the name and eventually became the generally accepted name in the United States. Planning for the trial was initiated by a team in Bell Laboratories, AT&T, and Western Electric before the Bell System divestiture, with the participation of Bell Atlantic. The purpose of these trials was to assess the revenue potential of services that depend on deployment of the common channel signaling network needed to transmit the calling number between originating and terminating central offices. Trial results were analyzed by Bellcore members of the original team.

In 1987, Bell Atlantic (now Verizon Communications) conducted another market trial in Hudson County, New Jersey, which was followed by limited deployment. BellSouth was the first company to deploy Caller ID commercially in December 1988 in Memphis, Tennessee, with a full deployment to its nine-state region over the next four years. Bell Atlantic was the second local telephone company to deploy Caller ID in New Jersey's Hudson County, followed by US West Communications (now Lumen Technologies) in 1989.

=== Type II caller ID ===
In 1995, Bellcore released another type of modulation, similar to Bell 202, with which it became possible to transmit caller ID information and even provide call-disposition options while the user was already on the telephone. This not-for-free service became known in some markets as call waiting ID, or (when it was combined with call-disposition options) Call Waiting Deluxe; it is technically referred to as Analog Display Services Interface. "Call Waiting Deluxe" is the Bellcore (now Telcordia Technologies) term for Type II caller ID with Disposition Options.

This class-based POTS-telephone calling feature works by combining the services of call waiting with caller ID but also introduces an "options" feature that, in conjunction with certain screen-based telephones, or other capable equipment, gives a telephone user the option to

- Switch: Place the current call on hold to take the second call (not a new feature)
- Hang-up: Disconnect the current call and take the second call (not a new feature)
- Please Hold: Send the caller either a custom or telephone-company-generated voice message asking the caller to hold
- Forward to Voice Mail: Send the incoming caller to the recipient’s voice mail service.
- Join: Add the incoming caller to the existing conversation.

                data            checksum
    digit     d1  d2  d3  d4  s1  s2  s3  s4
      1        1   0   0   0   1   1   1   1
      2        0   1   0   0   0   1   1   1
      3        1   1   0   0   1   0   1   1
      4        0   0   1   0   0   0   1   1
      5        1   0   1   0   1   1   0   1
      6        0   1   1   0   0   1   0   1
      7        1   1   1   0   1   0   0   1
      8        0   0   0   1   0   0   0   1
      9        1   0   0   1   1   1   1   0
      0        0   1   0   1   0   1   1   0
      *        1   1   0   1   1   0   1   0
      #        0   0   1   1   0   0   1   0
      A        1   0   1   1   1   1   0   0
      B        0   1   1   1   0   1   0   0
      C        1   1   1   1   1   0   0   0
      D        0   0   0   0   0   0   0   0

         FSK mark= 1200 Hz   space= 2200 Hz     1200 bpsk

The above flexibility requires the immediate presence of both a phone and a display screen, not one "several rooms away" from the other. By 2007, Verizon and AT&T had bundled these services with still others, including speed dialling, "free" inside wiring maintenance, and unlimited minutes. The result was increased monthly spending for those customers adding features, but reduced individual charges for those options they already had.

== Operation ==
In the United States and Canada, caller ID information is sent to the called party by the telephone switch as an analog data stream (similar to data passed between two modems), using Bell 202 modulation between the first and second rings, while the telephone unit is still on hook. If the telephone call is answered too quickly after the first ring, caller ID information may not be transmitted to the recipient. Also, in the United States and Canada a caller may block the display of the number they are calling from by dialling *67 before dialling the phone number. This will not work when dialling a toll-free number, where the receiver of the call pays for the call, or when 911 emergency calls are made. Dialling this code does not stop your number from being sent to the terminating central office, only from being displayed. The number can still be "collected" in the case of harassing phone calls.

There are two types of caller ID: number-only and name+number. Number-only caller ID is called Single Data Message Format (SDMF), which provides the caller's telephone number, the date and time of the call. Name+number caller ID is called Multiple Data Message Format (MDMF), which in addition to the information provided by SDMF format, can also provide the directory listed name for the particular number. Caller ID readers which are compatible with MDMF can also read the simpler SDMF format, but an SDMF caller ID reader will not recognize an MDMF data stream, and will act as if there is no caller ID information present, e.g. as if the line is not equipped for caller ID.

In general, CID as transmitted from the origin of the call is only the calling party's full phone number (including area code, and including international access code and country code if it's an international call). The calling party name is added by the consumer's terminating central office if the consumer has subscribed to that service. Calling name delivery is not automatic. A query (dip) with Signalling System 7 (SS7) query may be initiated by the called party's central office to retrieve the information for Calling Name delivery to the caller ID equipment at the subscriber's location, if the caller's name has not already been associated with the calling party's line at the originating central office. Canadian systems (depending on the provider) using CCS7 automatically (but not in all cases) send the calling name with the call set-up and routing information at the time of the call.

To look up the name associated with a phone number, the carrier, in some instances, has to access that information from a third-party database, and some database providers charge a small fee for each access to such databases. This CNAM dip fee is very small – less than a penny per call. AT&T starts their negotiations for CNAM dip fees at about $.004 per lookup. OpenCNAM fees are a bit more expensive, up to $.0048 per lookup. To avoid such charges, some carriers will report the name as "unavailable", or will report the name as "(city), (state)" based on the phone number, particularly for wireless callers. For toll-free numbers, they may report a string such as TOLLFREE NUMBER if the name is not available in a database.

Smartphones can use a third-party mobile app to do the name lookup in a third-party database.

=== Mobile and branded caller identity ===
In mobile networks, caller identification services have also been implemented as handset or carrier-integrated services rather than only as traditional network-based number or CNAM presentation. In 2007, Alltel introduced City ID, a Cequint application that displayed the city and state associated with an incoming telephone number on supported mobile phones. Verizon Wireless later introduced City ID on the LG Voyager, describing it as an application that automatically displayed the city and state where an incoming phone number was registered.

In 2011, T-Mobile USA introduced Name ID, a Cequint-powered service that displayed caller name information for calls from numbers not stored in a user's contacts.

Later caller identity systems expanded beyond name and number display to include call authentication and richer caller metadata. The STIR/SHAKEN framework authenticates Caller ID information for calls carried over IP networks, while Rich Call Data specifications allow caller information beyond the telephone number, such as calling name, logo, photo, or call reason, to be associated with a call.

=== Other signaling methods ===
Not all types of caller identification use 202-type modulation, nor do all systems send the information between the first and second ring. As a result, not all caller ID devices are compatible from country to country or within the same country, even though the basic phone system is the same.

Besides Bell, the most common on-hook caller ID standard is European standard ETSI EN 300 659-1, which defines three caller ID ("PSTN display") protocols:

- V.23 mode 2 (a different FSK protocol; without using the 75-baud reverse channel), after a normal ring.
- V.23 mode 2, before the ring, but after a special alerting signal (a dual-tone, a short ring "pulse", or a line reversal followed by a dual-tone).
- A DTMF signalling using the 16 standard dialing tones.

EN 300 659-2 expands the standard to "on-hook" (call-waiting) situations, still using V.23.

The Chinese caller ID standard of 1997 is largely similar to Bellcore (with the "type II" extension).

Most PBX systems in ex-USSR countries used an entirely different signaling method, often called "intervalless packet" (Russian: Безинтервальный пакет) and "two out of six" (Russian: Два из шести) or "AON" (Russian: АОН) among the people. It uses six multifrequency tones from 700 to 1700 Hz, which are sent in response by a PBX after a 1 second 500 Hz tone, sent by the phone's modem after picking up the line. So-called "AON-phones" and Caller ID converter boxes were demanded in ex-USSR countries, such as phones based on the "Русь" firmware, using Zilog Z80 or Intel MCS-51 (or its custom clones) as their CPU. Later Panasonic phones sold in those countries, also supported this standard. That was until CallerID became adopted in said countries as a paid service during the early 2000-s.

== Uses ==
=== Telemarketing ===
Telemarketing organisations often spoof caller ID. In some instances, this is done to provide a "central number" for consumers to call back, such as a toll-free number, rather than having consumers call back the outbound call center where the call actually originated. However, some telemarketers block or fraudulently spoof caller ID to prevent being traced. It is against United States federal law for telemarketers to block or to send misleading caller ID. Individuals may file civil suits and the Federal Communications Commission (FCC) can fine companies or individuals for illegally spoofing or blocking caller ID.

=== Mobile providers ===
Most mobile phone providers used the caller ID to automatically connect to voice mail when a call to the voice mail number was made from the associated mobile phone number, bypassing the need to enter a password. While this was convenient for many users, because of spoofing, this practice has been replaced by more secure authentication by many carriers.

== Regional differences ==
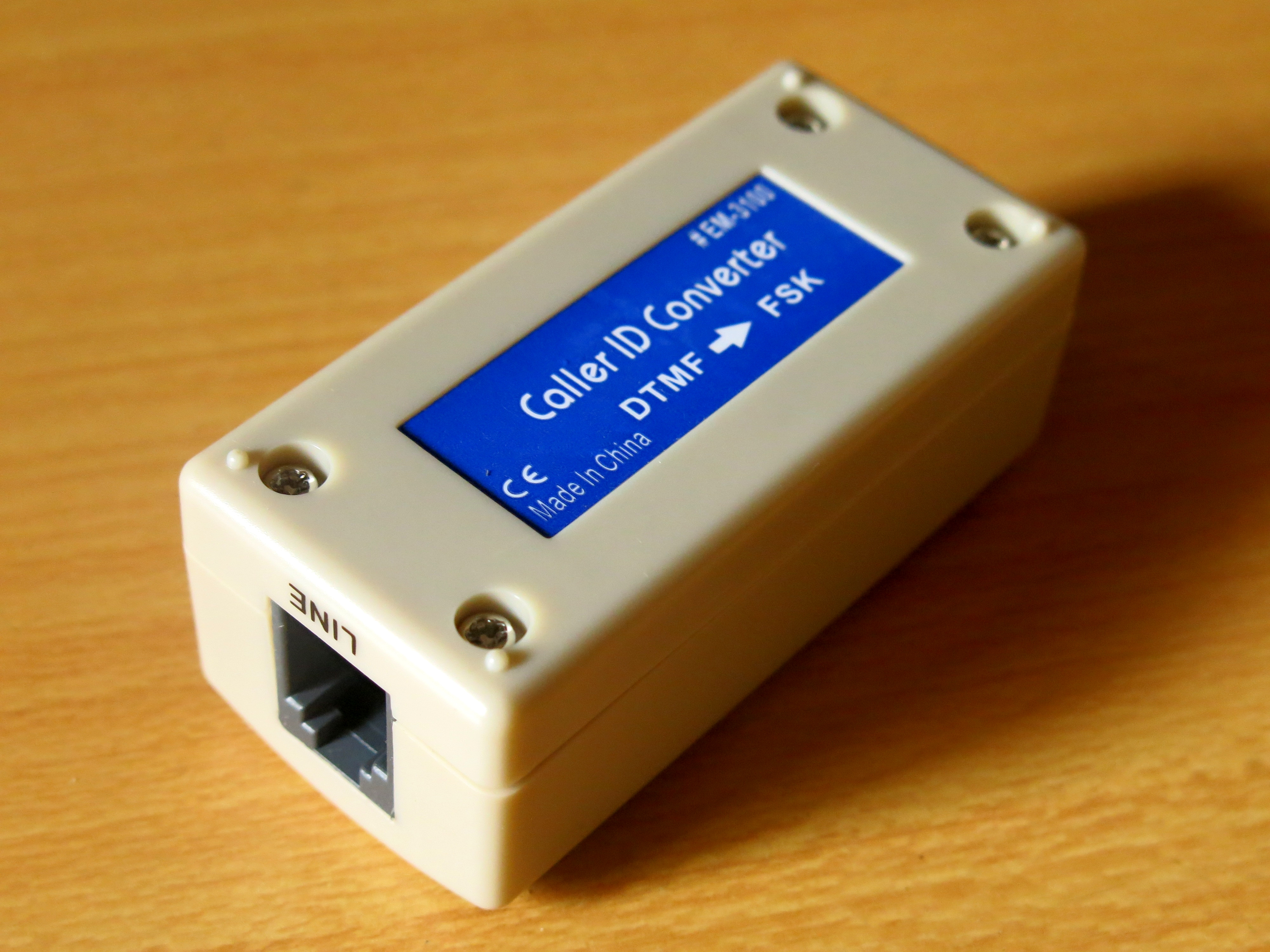
Converter that converts from DTMF to FSK format

Caller ID transmission is implemented using different technologies and standards in some countries. In the United States the Bellcore FSK standard is prevalent, whereas Taiwan uses ETSI FSK. Sometimes individual service providers within a country use different standards. Caller ID converters can be used to translate from one standard to another.

Country	Caller ID standard
Australia	Bellcore FSK
Brazil	Bellcore FSK / ETSI FSK / DTMF
Canada	Bellcore FSK
China	Bellcore FSK / DTMF
Hong Kong	Bellcore FSK
Ireland	ETSI (Ring Pulse)
Japan	ETSI FSK / DTMF
New Zealand	Bellcore FSK
Norway	ETSI FSK
Spain	ETSI FSK
Taiwan	DTMF / ETSI FSK
United Kingdom	SIN227 (V.23 FSK, line inversion)
United States	Bellcore FSK

=== UK ===
Telephone equipment usually displays CLID information with no difficulty. Modems are notoriously problematic; very few modems support the British Telecom standard in hardware; drivers for those that do often have errors that prevent CLID information from being recognised. Other UK telephone companies use slight variations on the Bellcore standard, and CLID support is "hit and miss".

=== Australia ===
CND is currently available in Australia to subscribers to the Integrated Services Digital Network (ISDN). There is a legislation under section 276 of the Australia Industry Code - Calling Number Display (ACIF C522: February 2003).

== Legal issues ==
=== United States ===
In the United States, telemarketers are required to transmit caller ID. This requirement went into effect on January 29, 2004. It is generally illegal to spoof Caller ID if done "with the intent to defraud, cause harm, or wrongfully obtain anything of value". The acts are prohibited under Truth in Caller ID Act of 2009.

Courts have ruled that caller ID is admissible. Providers are required by FCC rules to offer "per-call" blocking of caller ID to their customers. Legislation in the United States in 2007 made caller ID spoofing illegal for fraudulent purposes.

In March 2017, the FCC approved a new rule that would allow telecommunication companies to block robocallers that use fake caller ID numbers to conceal their true location and identity. The rule means telecommunication companies can block robocallers at the network level, long before a call passes through a carrier's network and arrives at a subscriber's house or business. T-Mobile was the first major US carrier to announce plans to implement blocking technologies based on the new rule.

Starting in mid-2017, and with intended culmination in 2019, the FCC pushed forward Caller ID certification implemented via a methodology of SHAKEN/STIR. This initiative was further strengthened by the TRACED Act, enacted in December 2019.

== Blocking and unblocking caller ID ==
The caller ID information is masked when a SkypeOut call is placed.

Caller ID blocking is the common term for a service by which a caller can prevent the display of the calling number on the recipient's telephone. Blocking the number is formally referred to as calling line identification restriction (CLIR). This customer option was part of the legal authorization for New York State's 1992 authorization of Caller ID.

Telecommunications regulators vary in their requirements for the use and effectiveness of assorted technologies to prevent numbers from being displayed. Generally, unlisted numbers are always blocked. Non-published and regular listed numbers are not usually blocked. But there is varying treatment for the determination of call display blocking because of many factors. If desired, customers should inquire carefully to make sure their number will not be displayed. The telephone service provider may also have vertical service codes which can be dialed to configure blocking as active for all calls or on a call-by-call basis. In some locations in the United States, regulations allow (or require) blocking to be automatic and transparent to the caller.

Where blocking is applied on a call-by-call basis (that is, at the time a call is made), subscribers can block their caller ID by dialing a special code (a vertical service code, or VSC) before making a call. In North America and some other regions, the code is *67 (1167 on rotary phones), while in the United Kingdom and Ireland, it is 141. This special code does not block the information from companies using call capture technology. This means that equipment with caller ID will simply display the word "PRIVATE" or "WITHHELD". When CNID is blocked at the caller's request, the number is actually transmitted through the entire telephone network, with the "presentation withheld" flag set; the destination CO is expected to honor this flag, but sometimes does not – especially when the destination phone number is served by an ISDN PRI.

Alternatively, in cases where caller ID is being blocked automatically, it can only be released on a call-by-call basis by dialing a special code (*82 in North America; 1470 in the UK). See "Enabling", below.

Similarly, some countries offer anonymous caller rejection, which rejects all calls when the subscriber's name, number (or both) is blocked. Some telephone companies protect their clients from receiving calls with blocked information by routing anonymous calls to a service (such as AT&T Privacy Manager), where the caller is required to announce themself. The service then asks the called party if they want to accept or reject the call. Other telephone companies play a recording to the caller advising them of the called party's rejection configuration, and often offer advice (such as prefixing their dialing with *82) on how to get their call to the intended called party. Emergency services will most likely be able to show the restricted number using a service called calling line identification restriction override (CLIRO), or by using general ANI services. These features create a cat-and-mouse game situation, whereby subscribers must purchase additional services in order to cancel out other services.

=== Disabling caller ID delivery ===
Depending on the operator and country, there are a number of prefix codes that can block or disable Caller ID transmission by the caller. Prefixing a telephone number with the following codes disables Caller ID on a per-call basis:

Country/Region	Prefix
Albania	#31# (cell phones)
Argentina	*31# (landlines) or #31# (most cell phone companies)
Australia	#31# (mobile phones) 1831 (analogue landline) *67 (NBN landline)
Brazil	#31# (mobile phones)
Bulgaria	#31# (mobile phones)
Canada	#31# (mobile phones) or *67 (landlines)
China (mainland)	Not allowed
Croatia	#31#
Denmark	#31#
France	#31# (cell phones) or 3651 (landlines)
Germany	On most landlines and mobiles, *31#; however, some mobile providers use #31#.
Greece	*31* (landlines), #31# (cell phones).
Hong Kong	133
Iceland	*31*
India	#31# after network unlocked
Ireland	#31# (dialling from mobile) 141 (dialling from landlines)
Israel	*43 (landlines) or #31# (most cell phone companies)
Italy	*67# (landlines) or #31# (most cell phone companies)
Japan	184
Nepal	*9# (NTC)
Netherlands	*31*, #31# (KPN)
New Zealand	0197 (Telecom/Spark), *67 (Vodafone), #31# (2degrees)
North America	*67, 1167 (rotary phone), #31# (AT&T Wireless)
Pakistan	*32# PTCL
Poland	#31# (mobile phones)
Romania	#31#
Serbia	*31* (landlines), #31# (cell phones).
South Africa	*31* (Telkom)
South Africa	#31# (Cell Phones)
South Korea	*23 or *23# (most cell phone companies)
Spain	#31# (Cell Phones); 067 (landlines)
Sweden	#31#
Switzerland	*31# (or *31+Targetnumber -> Call-by-Call disable) (landline) #31# (or #31+Targetnumber -> Call-by-Call disable) (mobile)
United Kingdom	141
United States	*67

Other countries and networks vary; however, on GSM mobile networks, callers may dial #31# before the number they wish to call to disable it.

Some countries and network providers do not allow Caller ID blocking based on the domestic telecommunications regulations, or CLIR is only available as an external app or value-added service.

=== Enabling caller ID delivery ===
Depending on the operator and country, there are a number of prefix codes that can unblock or enable Caller ID transmission by the caller.

Country	Prefix code
Australia	*31# (mobile phones) 1832 (analogue landline) *65 (NBN landline)
Czech Republic	*31* (landline)
Denmark	*31*
Germany	*31# (Some mobile providers)
India	*31#
Ireland	*31# (dialling from mobile); 142 (dialling from landlines)
Japan	186
Hong Kong	1357
New Zealand	0196 (Telecom/Spark)
North America	*82 (*UB, UnBlock); 1182 (rotary phone).
Switzerland	#31#
United Kingdom	1470

On GSM mobile networks, callers may dial *31# to enable caller ID on all subsequent calls.

== Caller ID spoofing ==
Caller ID spoofing is the practice of causing the telephone network to display a number on the recipient's caller ID display that is different than that of the actual originating station. Many telephone services, such as ISDN PRI based PBX installations, and voice over IP services, permit the caller to configure customized caller ID information. In corporate settings this permits the announcement of switchboard number or customer service numbers. Caller ID spoofing may be illegal in some countries or in certain situations.

== Dip fee fraud ==
A consumer's telephone company must pay a small fee for the Caller ID text that is transmitted during a call. The fee is called a CNAM dip fee. It is named a dip fee because the called party's carrier pays a fee to dip into the originating telephone company's database to get the Caller ID information.

Several companies engage in generating dip fees by catering to companies that make a large number of outbound calls. CallerId4U and Pacific Telecom Communications Group cater to telemarketers and generate revenue on fees from Caller ID information. The telemarketers enter into an agreement with companies like CallerId4U and Pacific Telecom Communications Group and share the revenue produced during the telemarketing call.

Dip fees vary wildly. According to Doug McIntyre, the wholesale rates are on the order of $0.002 to $0.006 per database dip. And according to Aaron Woolfson, president of TelSwitch Inc, the fee structure for dip fee fraud can include:

- the carriers pay a fee of $0.003 per call or $300 per 100,000 calls to the database owner
- the database owner pays the number dealers $0.0024 per call or $240 per 100,000 calls
- the number dealers share revenue with the robocaller $0.00096 or $96 per 100,000 calls

Consumers face significant barriers to exiting a call list and often cannot have themselves removed from the list. Calling the opt-out numbers often results in a fast-busy so the call never completes and the consumer remains on the list.

According to reports companies like CallerId4U have thousands of phone numbers and thousands of FTC complaints filed against them each month for violating Do Not Call registration. The large number of phone numbers dilute the number of complaints against the company and phone number.

== See also ==
- Calling Name Presentation
- Local number portability
- Location Routing Number
- Truth in Caller ID Act of 2009
