= Followap =

Former technology company (1999–2006)

Followap, Inc.
- Industry: Telecommunications; Internet; Computer software
- Founded: 1 January 1999
- Founders: Ben Volach; Dan Volach
- Fate: Acquired
- Successor: NeuStar, Inc.
- Headquarters: Staines-upon-Thames, United Kingdom
- Products: Mobile Messenger; Interconnect Platform; Presence Platform
- Brands: iFollow
- Number of employees: 180 (2006)
- Website: www.followap.com

Followap was a company that developed mobile instant messaging (MIM) and presence software for mobile operators. It was founded in 1999 and managed by Dan Volach and Ben Volach in the United Kingdom.

Followap launched the first commercial mobile messenger service in 2000 in partnership with Eircell, Ireland's mobile network operator. It later worked with several European mobile operators, such as Bouygues Telecom in France, to supply messaging and presence platforms.

According to the company, Followap's customers included the Vodafone Group, Hutchison 3G Group, BT Group, Turkcell, Telecom Italia, Wind, and VimpelCom.

Followap developed messaging platforms that allowed mobile network operators to provide interoperable instant messaging services. In March 2003, Followap announced that its iFollow v2.2 product was certified under the Wireless Village/OMA IMPS standard for instant messaging and presence. The company also reported partnerships with handset manufacturers, such as LG, which introduced its IM client for mobile phones. It further claims that Turkcell selected its solution for its “TurkcellMessenger” service and that it supports standards such as OMA, 3GPP, and IETF (including XMPP).

The company was acquired by NeuStar for approx. $140M in cash, in November 2006. Investors included Sequoia Capital and Carmel Ventures.
