= Nélio José Nicolai =

Brazilian electrotechnician

Nélio José Nicolai (c. 1940 – 11 October 2017) was a Brazilian electrotechnician who is believed to have invented caller ID.

Nicolai was born in Belo Horizonte and studied at the Escola Técnica de Minas Gerais (current Federal Center for Technological Education of Minas Gerais). Nicolai moved to Brasília in the 1970 decade, working for Telebrasília. There, in 1977 he developed a system for identifying phone calls as a way to curb prank callers. The system was called 'Bina' (acronym of B identifica número A Portuguese for 'B identifies number A').

Nicolai filed a patent for the first version of Bina in 1980, recognised eight years later. After losing his job in 1984, the inventor developed a second version of Bina, patented in 1992.

Nicolai fought with telecommunications companies for the right to receive royalties for an adaptation of the caller ID used by telephone exchanges and filed lawsuits against phone operators Claro and Vivo. In 2012 Claro settled with Nicolai to pay 0,25 percent of his request.
