= Local number portability =

Keeping a phone number when switching carriers

Local number portability (LNP) for fixed lines, and full mobile number portability (FMNP) for mobile phone lines, refers to the ability of a "customer of record" of an existing fixed-line or mobile telephone number assigned by a local exchange carrier (LEC) to reassign the number to another carrier ("service provider portability"), move it to another location ("geographic portability"), or change the type of service ("service portability"). In most cases, there are limitations to transferability with regards to geography, service area coverage, and technology. Location Portability and Service Portability are not consistently defined or deployed in the telecommunication industry.

In the United States and Canada, mobile number portability is referred to as WNP or WLNP (Wireless LNP). In the rest of the world it is referred to as mobile number portability (MNP). Wireless number portability is available in some parts of Africa, Asia, Australia, Latin America and most European countries including Britain; however, this relates to transferability between mobile phone lines only. Canada, South Africa and the United States are the only countries that offer full number portability transfers between both fixed lines and mobile phone lines, because mobile and fixed line numbers are mixed in the same area codes, and are billed identically for the calling party, the mobile user usually pays for incoming calls and texts; in other countries all mobile numbers are placed in higher priced mobile-dedicated area codes and the originator of the call to the mobile phone pays for the call. The government of Hong Kong has tentatively approved fixed-mobile number portability; however, as of July 2012, this service is not yet available.

Some cellular telephone companies will charge for this conversion as a regulatory cost recovery fee.

== History ==
LNP was invented by Edward Sonnenberg while working for Siemens.

Though it was introduced as a tool to promote competition in the heavily monopolized wireline telecommunications industry, number portability became popular with the advent of mobile telephones, since in most countries different mobile operators are provided with different area codes and, without portability, changing one's operator would require changing one's number. Some operators, especially incumbent operators with large existing subscriber bases, have argued against portability on the grounds that providing this service incurs considerable overhead, while others argue that it prevents vendor lock-in and allows them to compete fairly on price and service. Due to this conflict of interest, number portability is usually mandated for all operators by telecommunications regulatory authorities. In the US, LNP was mandated by the Federal Communications Commission (FCC) in 1996. The mandate required all carriers in the top 100 metropolitan statistical areas (MSAs) to be "LNP-capable" and port numbers to any carriers sending a BFR (bona fide request). The ability to keep a number while switching providers is thought to be attractive to consumers. It was also a major point made by CLECs (competitive local exchange carriers) preventing customers from leaving ILECs (incumbent local exchange carriers), thus hindering competition. Details regarding the reasons for LNP and how it is to be implemented can be found in the First Report and Order referenced above.

In the US, the FCC has mandated this in order to increase competition among providers. As of late November 2003, LNP was required for all landline and Wireless common carriers, so long as the number is being ported to the same geographical area or telephone exchange. This latest mandate included carriers outside the top 100 MSAs that previously enjoyed a rural carrier exemption.

== Portability schemes ==
There are four main methods to route a number whose operator has changed.

=== All Call Query (ACQ) ===
The operator that originates the call always checks a centralized database and obtains the route to the call. The originating operator then routes the call to Serving Network.

=== Query on Release (QoR) ===
The operator that originates the call first checks with the operator to which the number initially belonged, the donor operator. The donor operator verifies the call and informs that it no longer possesses the number. The operator that originates the call then checks the centralized database, as is done with ACQ.

=== Call Dropback ===
Also known as Return to Pivot (RoP). The operator that originates the call first checks with the donor operator. The donor operator checks its own database and provides a new route. The operator that originates the call then uses this route to forward the call. No central database is consulted.

=== Onward Routing (OR) ===
The operator that originates the call routes the call to the donor operator. The donor operator checks its own database and obtains a new route. The operator to which the number was designated routes the call to the new operator. This model is called indirect routing.

== Technical issues ==
Complexity for number portability can come from many sources. Historically, numbers were assigned to various operators in blocks. The operators, who were often also service providers, then provided these numbers to the subscribers of telephone services. Numbers were also recycled in blocks. With number portability, it is envisioned that the size of these blocks may grow smaller or even to single numbers. Once this occurs the granularity of such operations will represent a greater workload for the telecommunications provider. With phone numbers assigned to various operators in blocks, the system worked quite well in a fixed line environment since everyone was attached to the same infrastructure. The situation becomes somewhat more complex in a wireless environment such as that created by cellular communications.

In number portability the “donor network” provides the number and the “recipient network” accepts the number. The operation of donating a number requires that a number be “snapped out” from a network and “snapped into” the receiving network. If the subscriber ceases to need the number then it is normal that the original donor receive the number back and “snaps back” the number to its network. The situation is slightly more complex if the user leaves the first operator for a second and then subsequently elects to use a third operator. In this case the second operator will return the number to the first and then it is assigned to the third.

In cellular communications the concept of a location registry exists to tie a “mobile station” (such as a cellular phone) to the number. If a number is dialed it is necessary to be able to determine where in the network the mobile station exists. Some mechanism for such forwarding must exist. (For an example of such a system, see the article on the GSM network.)

In the US, there are standards for portability defined by the FCC, the LNPA, NANPA and the ATIS which are agreed upon by all member providers to help make LNP as cost-efficient and expedient as possible while still retaining a healthy level of security for all providers and in respect of the highest level of customer service. These rules, first defined in the 1st, 2nd and 3rd Reports and Orders by the FCC (publicly available at fcc.gov), are further detailed by the LNPA in order to ensure any provider can successfully port numbers to any other provider. iconectiv provides a national database called the NPAC (National Portability Administration Center) which contains the correct routing information for all ported and pooled numbers in the US and Canada. The NPAC maintains detailed documentation of the procedure common among US carriers to port numbers as described here.

Providers use SS7 to route calls throughout the US/Canada network. SS7 accesses databases for various services such as CNAM, LIDB, VSC and LNP. Calls to ported numbers are completed when a customer who calls a ported number sends the dialed number to a provider's SSP (Service Switch Point), where it is identified either as a local call or not. If the call is local, the switch has the NPA-NXX in its routing table as portable, so it sends a routing request to the Signal Transfer Point (STP) which accesses a local database that is updated by an LSMS (Local Service Management System) which holds all routing for all ported numbers to which the carrier is responsible for completing calls. If routing information is found, a response is sent to the "query" containing the information necessary to properly route the call. If it is not a local number, the call is passed on to the STP and routed until it gets to a local carrier who will perform the "query" mentioned earlier and route the call accordingly.

The routing information necessary to complete these calls is known as a Location Routing Number (LRN). The LRN is no more than a simple 10-digit telephone number that resides in the switch of the service provider currently providing service for the ported telephone number.

When a provider receives a request to port a telephone number from a new customer, that provider sends an industry-standard Local Service Request (LSR) to the existing (or "old") provider. When the Old Provider receives this request, it sends back Firm Order Confirmation (FOC) and the process of porting the number(s) begins. Either provider can initiate the port using a Service Order Activator (SOA or LSOA) which directly edits the NPAC database mentioned before. Providers can also make these requests within the NPAC database directly. If the new provider initiates the port, it is called a "pull," and if the old provider initiates, it is a "push." Once the number is pulled or pushed, the providers must concur the request and the new provider must "activate" the number using the LRN of the switch serving the customer on the agreed due date. At the point this is completed, the number is ported.

Much of this process is duplicated in intermodal portability (porting between wireline and wireless providers). There are a few technical differences, however, in WLNP—Especially with concern to the time intervals allowed.

== Fax and paging numbers ==
Some service providers, especially related to fax services, do not qualify as a "local exchange carrier" or other form of telecommunications carrier. Such service providers may be the "customer of record" from the LEC's perspective. As a result, the applicable law may not require that such service provider port out the number to another provider. Users and providers often negotiate portability and port out fees. eFax is one vendor that claims it is not a telecommunications company and does not allow porting out of numbers originally assigned by them to their customers; however, numbers ported by customers into eFax may be ported out.

A fax machine connected to its own physical telephone line at the subscriber's premises is portable in the same manner as any other standard wireline service. Distinctive ring sometimes poses problems, as one landline may have two or three numbers with a fax or dial-up modem programmed to answer just one of the secondary numbers on the line. Porting out the main number will usually unsubscribe the entire line, disconnecting the secondary numbers without moving them to the new provider.

In Canada, pocket pager answering services are exempted from all local number portability requirements. The same is not true of mobile telephones, which are fully portable to another carrier or another service type (such as landline or voice over IP) within the same local interconnection region.

== Portability by country ==
=== Africa ===
==== Kenya ====
In Kenya, announced in 2004 that mobile number portability would be available as of July 1, 2005 and fixed-line number portability as of July 1, 2006. Mobile Number Portability was officially launched on April 1, 2011.

==== South Africa ====
In South Africa, announced Number Portability Company (Pty) Ltd (Reg. No. 2005/040348/07) was established in 2005 and Mobile Number Portability was introduced on 10 November 2006. Geographic Number Portability (between fixed operators) was introduced on 26 April 2010. The Mobile Number Portability Company is jointly owned by the mobile and fixed operators including Vodacom, MTN, Cell C, Telkom and Neotel.

=== Americas ===
==== Argentina ====
In Argentina, full mobile number portability is available since March 2012, being a law approved in 2000. It originally took up to ten working days to be effective. Since July 2017, however, it takes up to a 24-hour period to be effective.

==== Brazil ====
In Brazil, number portability (both fixed and mobile) is available nationwide since March, 2009. However, it's not possible to port a fixed line number to a mobile line number and vice versa . It's possible to carry the fixed line number within the same municipality and for mobile line number within the same area code (comprising from parts of a state to an entire state).

==== Canada ====
In Canada, wireline/competitive local exchange carriers must provide portability. As of March 14, 2007, wireless carriers must provide portability in most of Canada.

Numbers are only portable within an LIR (local interconnection region), regions defined by the ILEC and approved by the Canadian Radio-television and Telecommunications Commission (CRTC), each of which covers a number of exchanges. Each LIR has a Point of Interconnection (POI) exchange through which calls are routed, and if a number is ported out to a different LIR then calls to that destination will be rejected by the POI switch.

Not all exchanges support LNP, typically there needs to exist competition within an exchange before an ILEC will enable portability, and then only by request. Most small local independent telephone company exchanges are exempted from competition and local number portability requirements. Numbers in the rarely used non-geographic area code 600 are not portable.

==== Dominican Republic ====
In the Dominican Republic, number portability in both mobile and local telephony was launched on September 30, 2009. In March 2009, the Dominican Telecommunications Institute (INDOTEL) selected Informática El Corte Inglés to administer the number portability.

==== Ecuador ====
In Ecuador, Mobile Number Portability has been available since 12 October 2009.

==== Mexico ====
In the Mexico is first Latin American country to have number portability in both mobile and local telephony. The Federal Commission of Telecommunications (COFETEL) applied this law, in defense and regulation of the Telmex monopoly. It was also a condition for Telmex for entering the video market triple play. Number portability has been available since July 5, 2008. The service used to be administered by Telcordia Technologies.

On August 29, 2019, the Federal Telecommunications Institute (IFT) announced that at the request of the telecommunications service providers, it would migrate its portability database administration to Mediafon Datapro. As a result, portability was temporarily suspended from August 30 to September 1. On September 2, portability was resumed with the service now being handled by Mediafon Datapro.

==== United States ====
In the United States, 47 U.S.C. § 251(b)(2), added by the Telecommunications Act of 1996, requires all local exchange carriers (LECs) to offer number portability in accordance with the regulations of the Federal Communications Commission (FCC). The FCC implemented regulations on 27 June 1996, with LECs required to implement them in the 100 largest Metropolitan Statistical Areas by 1 October 1997 and elsewhere by 31 December 1998. (The regulations are currently located at 47 CFR 52, 47 CFR 52.20 et seq.) The North American Numbering Council (NANC) was directed to select the Local Number Portability Administrators (LNPAs), akin to the North American Numbering Plan (NANP) which administers the North American Numbering Plan.

LNP was first implemented in the US upon the establishment of the original Number Portability Administration Center (NPAC) in Chicago, Illinois, in 1998. This service covered select rate centers in the Ameritech region. Thereafter, as switches and telephone networks were upgraded with location routing number (LRN) capability, LNP was deployed sequentially to the remaining Regional Bell Operating Company (RBOC) areas. The FCC since has mandated Wireless Local Number Portability starting November 24, 2003 (in metropolitan areas) and allowed operators to charge an additional monthly Long-Term Telephone Number Portability End-Use Charge as compensation. On November 10, 2003, the FCC additionally ruled that number portability applies to landline numbers moving to mobile telephones and, on October 31, 2007, the FCC made clear that the obligation to provide LNP extends to VoIP providers.

Toll-free telephone numbers (area code +1-800) have been portable through the RespOrg system since 1993 in the US and 1994 in Canada.

=== Asia ===
==== Hong Kong ====
In Hong Kong, fixed line number portability has been available since July 1, 1995, the same day of fixed line telephone market liberalization (i.e., reversal of franchised monopoly), which was a requirement from the government. Mobile number portability has been available since March 1, 1999. Hong Kong was the first country in Asia offering number portability. Although the government allowed porting a fixed line number to a mobile carrier or vice versa, the introduction of this service shall be decided by the fixed/mobile carriers in a voluntary basis. As of October 2009, fixed-mobile number portability is not available.

==== India ====
In India, mobile number portability launched in the state of Haryana on November 25, 2010. It was finally launched all over India on January 20, 2011.

==== Japan ====
In Japan, fixed line portability began in March, 2001. 番号ポータビリティー制度 (bangō portability seido – commonly referred to as portability or MNP) began on October 24, 2006. Users are able to change cellular phone carriers without changing their number for a fee of 5000 yen. However, e-mail addresses are subject to change, and music/data downloaded may become unusable.

The Japanese Ministry of Internal Affairs and Communications (MIC) spent three years to put mobile number portability into practice, since its initial workgroup started in November, 2003. As a result, NTT DoCoMo, KDDI and Softbank accelerated the price battle, but it was of little effect due to already competitive price plans and customer loyalty. Overall, mobile number portability in Japan was not very successful, because of high transition costs for the customer due to SIM lock, the long time it took to establish mobile number portability, allowing operators to fence in subscribers with price plans, and the significance of mobile Internet mail.

==== Malaysia ====
In Malaysia, mobile number portability plan to start by mid-2008, according to an article on the National News Agency Bernama

==== Pakistan ====
In Pakistan, (پاکستان) the PTA mandated mobile number portability on March 23, 2007. Users are able to change their cellular phone service for free. They just have to pay for new sim cards depending upon the provider they are migrating. Some companies even do not charge anything.

==== Singapore ====
Singapore was one of the first countries to introduce number portability for mobile telephones in 1997. This is currently implemented through voice call & SMS forwarding. True number portability was realized from June 13, 2008, with the implementation of a Centralised Number Portability Database Solution, as proposed by the Infocomm Development Authority (IDA) of Singapore.

==== South Korea ====
In South Korea, mobile number portability service started from January 1, 2004. One thing different from other countries is that it started from SK Telecom, the dominant operator which has over 50% of market share. To prevent users' churning to the dominant operator, the government gave six months' and one year's delay to the second and the third operator, respectively. As a result, only SK Telecom's subscribers could move to other operators during the first six months.

==== Sri Lanka ====
In Sri Lanka, mobile number portability service started in August 2007. This is supported by Sri Lanka Telecom owned Mobitel Lanka and other cellular operators.

=== Europe ===
In the European Union, all telephone providers are required to provide number portability under the Universal Services Directive (2002/22/EU).

==== Albania ====
In Albania, mobile number portability was implemented in 04.05.2011 (AKEP). For fixed-line numbers, it started on some geographical areas in September 2012 and was available in all country by 01.04.2013 (AKEP).

==== Austria ====
In Austria, number portability was implemented in October 2004.

==== Belgium ====
In Belgium, number portability was implemented in October 2002.

==== Cyprus ====
In Cyprus, geographic, non-geographic and mobile number portability is required as of July 12, 2004.

==== Denmark ====
In Denmark, portability of fixed line numbers and ISDN was implemented on January 1, 2001. Mobile number portability was implemented on July 1, 2001. In 2006, 238,293 fixed lines were ported, along with 456,159 mobile lines. Considering that the number of fixed lines by the end of 2006 was 2,974,000 and the number of mobile lines was 5.828.000, roughly 7.9% of lines were ported in 2006.

==== Estonia ====
In Estonia, number portability is required from fixed operators since January 1, 2004 and should be required from mobile operators as from January 1, 2005.

==== Finland ====
In Finland, mobile number portability was implemented on July 25, 2003. The impact of mobile number portability in Finland exceeds that of other countries. In one year (June 2003 – June 2004), the combined market share of TeliaSonera, Elisa and DNA fell from 98.7% to 87.9%.

==== France ====
In France, geographic number portability has been available since January 1, 1998. As of January 1, 2001, it became possible to change geographic location or operator while keeping the same number. Mobile number portability was introduced on June 30, 2003. However, due to its lack of effectiveness, a new system was launched on May 21, 2007 with two objectives: having a single contact for the customer (the new operator should take all the steps towards mobile number portability) and a maximum period of ten days for mobile number portability to have effect.

==== Germany ====
In Germany, fixed number portability was introduced on January 1, 1998, for geographic numbers and numbers for non-geographic services. Mobile number portability was implemented on November 1, 2002.

==== Greece ====
In Greece, fixed number portability is available since January 1, 2003. Mobile number portability was implemented on March 1, 2004.

==== Hungary ====
In Hungary, portability exists for geographic numbers since January 1, 2004. Portability for non-geographic numbers (including mobile numbers) is available since May 1, 2004. There has been added a special area code +36 21, which legally allows the phone number to be anywhere in the world, beside having the +36 country code prefix.

==== Ireland ====
In Ireland, local number portability was implemented in 2000, using an IN solution with a shared routing database. Partial mobile number portability was introduced in 1997 with full portability becoming available in 2003.

==== Italy ====
In Italy, mobile number portability is available since April 30, 2002.

==== Luxembourg ====
In Luxembourg, mobile number portability introduced in June 2004. The Mobile Number Portability Central (MNPC) managed by the G.I.E Telcom E.I.G. operator group and developed, installed and operated by Systor Trondheim AS of Norway, was put into commercial operations from February 2005.

==== Norway ====
In Norway, Fixed number portability was introduced in 2000, one year before the introduction of mobile number portability. The administrative solution for fixed and mobile number portability in Norway, the National Reference Database (NRDB), was put into service in 2000. The NRDB is owned and managed by the 8 largest network operators in Norway through the company NRDB AS. The reference database was developed, installed and is presently operated by Systor Trondheim AS.

==== Portugal ====
In Portugal, fixed number portability was implemented on June 30, 2001. Mobile number portability has been available since January 1, 2002. The administrative Reference Entity (Entidade de Referencia (ER)) interconnecting all network operators and service providers is operated by a local third party, Portabil S.A., a joint venture between the internationally well known companies Logica and Systor Trondheim AS.

==== Slovakia ====
In Slovakia, number portability was implemented in May 2004.

==== Spain ====
In Spain, number portability among cell phone carriers is available since October 1, 2000, without any cost to the end user. The technical details for the process are regulated by the CMT (Comisión del Mercado de las Telecomunicaciones or Telecoms Market Commission) and all carriers are obliged to comply with their requirements. As of August 2007, cell number portability must complete in 5 business days (i.e. excluding weekends) from the moment the request is confirmed by the customer, with the actual switch occurring late at night to avoid missing any calls. The user wakes up using a new SIM-card from the new cell provider while keeping the number.

In the mature Spanish cell phone market (as of June 2007, with 107 lines per 100 inhabitants), portability has been widely used by the competing carriers as a way to steal each other's customers, usually offering them free handsets or extra credit. From June 2006 to June 2007 alone, 3,957,556 cell phone lines switched carriers via this proceeding, about 10% of all cellular lines in use. Spain is the one country in the European Union where more customers have switched cell phone providers, with more than 9 million carrier switches completed as of April 2007.

As for the fixed line market, number portability is also available since year 2000, but weaker competition meant that actual adoption of the fixed number portability process was quite sluggish. As of August 2004, 1,041,246 fixed line switches were completed.

Fixed line market is peculiar in Spain, since only two local loop providers can operate at each particular region (or demarcación as regulated by the CMT): a cable carrier (such as Ono, R and many others) and the former State monopoly (Telefónica). The sole of them operating statewide—Telefónica—is obliged to provide other firms with access to their exchange facilities or rental/transfer of their copper last-mile loops, at fees regulated by the CMT (practice known as local loop unbundling). As cable providers do not have a statewide footprint, many users have no actual chance of applying for "true" fixed number portability, that is, giving up Telefónica's service altogether. Some of them can however get their service from a third company who will bill the service and then pay Telefónica for the copper pair rental and maintenance fees, with the customer receiving a single bill. In the end, as Telefónica set up a reselling program for their fixed lines and DSL internet access, the former monopoly is still much in control of the fixed line market, including profitable broadband access. In fact, Telefónica was fined in excess of €152 million by the European Commission on July 4, 2007 on ground of "impeding competition on the Spanish broadband internet access market for more than five years, and so depriving consumers and business of a choice of broadband suppliers".

Due to the billing scheme used throughout Europe and most of the world, where the calling party assumes the full cost of the call, and calling a cellphone is usually more expensive than calling a fixed line, a distinction must be made between cellphone numbers (beginning with "6" or, from October 2011, "71", "72", "73" or "74", ) and fixed numbers (usually beginning with 9 or 8). Full number portability in which a customer transfers a cell to a fixed number or vice versa is thus not possible. See Telephone numbering in Spain for more information.

==== Sweden ====
In Sweden, fixed line portability was implemented in 1999 and mobile number portability was implemented on September 1, 2001. At the introduction of mobile number portability the Swedish operators joined forces and procured a central solution, SNPAC CRDB, which is a central reference database now containing both the fixed and mobile portings.

==== Switzerland ====
In Switzerland, mobile number portability is available since March 1, 2000, and land line number portability since April 2002.

==== Turkey ====
In Turkey, mobile number portability was implemented in Nov 2008. Fixed number portability was initially planned to take place exactly 6 months following the mobile number portability, on May 9, 2009. However, it was not until September 9, 2009 that the regulator approved the procedure for fixed number portability. Since then, fixed and mobile operators, and the incumbent, are working to get the process going and performing interoperability tests. However, there is still progress to be made and the progress for fixed number portability has not proved to be going ahead as in-time as the mobile number portability.

==== United Kingdom ====
In the United Kingdom, Ofcom directs fixed-line telephone network providers, mobile phone providers and broadband service providers to provide number portability under the Porting Authorisation Code rules and Migration Authorisation Code code of practice respectively. As the UK was an EU member country, the Ofcom direction was intended to reflect the requirements of EU Directive 2002/22/EU.

==== Serbia ====
In Serbia, number portability service on public telephone networks at a fixed location is available as of 1 April 2014.

=== Middle East ===
==== Israel ====
In Israel, number portability is free and takes 15 minutes. All cellular lines can be ported, Landline numbers may be ported, except between regions (area codes). Wireless and VoIP companies each have a single area code for the whole country. Within it, numbers may be ported with no regard to geographic area.

There is no porting between landline and cellular lines. (date implemented? http://www.moc.gov.il/new/documents/engineering/faq_24.8.05.pdf )

==== Oman ====
In Oman, Mobile Number Portability was mandated on the Public Mobile Operators, Nawras and Oman Mobile, via the licenses issued to them by the Telecommunications Regulatory Authority (TRA). Mobile number portability was launched on August 26, 2006. Users are able to change cellular phone carriers without changing their number for a nominal fee of 3 OMR.

==== Saudi Arabia ====
In Saudi Arabia mobile number portability was launched on July 8, 2006, to be the first country to launch this service in the ME region. A centralized number portability clearinghouse (NPC) solution was implemented by CITC(the telecom regulation authority) and the two mobile phone operators were obliged to implement the MNP solution in their networks and to interface with the NPC. the service was provided to the mobile subscribers for free.

=== Oceania ===
==== Australia ====
In Australia, local telephone numbers have been portable since 1999. The porting process is based on a peer-to-peer file exchange between fixed line operators. According to ACMA, local number portability came into full effect at the start of 2000. Mobile number portability has been available as of September 25, 2001.

For service providers who require knowledge of porting activity to enable them to deliver voice calls directly to the current "network owner", they can either form agreements with all of the fixed-line operators, or use a third-party LNP provider, such as Paradigm.One.

==== New Zealand ====
In New Zealand, local and mobile number portability (LMNP) began on April 1, 2007. The rules governing LMNP originate in the Number Portability Determination. Ports are authorised, scheduled, and coordinated via a centralised number portability system called IPMS (Industry Portability Management System). All networks update their own routing and confirm this to IPMS. There are now 26 carriers and service providers that participate in LMNP in New Zealand, over a million numbers have been ported.

== See also ==
- Local loop unbundling
- Letter of Agency
- Porting Authorisation Code
- Mobile number portability
