= TRACED Act =

US legislation regarding caller ID spoofing

The Pallone-Thune Telephone Robocall Abuse Criminal Enforcement and Deterrence Act, or Pallone-Thune TRACED Act, is a United States federal law enacted in 2019 to strengthen efforts to prevent and enforce against illegal robocalls and caller ID spoofing.

The act expands the authority of the Federal Communications Commission (FCC) to require voice service providers to implement caller ID authentication technologies like STIR/SHAKEN. It also authorizes and regulates network-based call blocking, establishes safeguards and redress for erroneously blocked calls, enhances information sharing and traceback of unlawful calls, protects consumers from scams such as one-ring calls, supports enforcement coordination with the Department of Justice, and directs targeted initiatives such as hospital robocall protections and oversight of the reassigned numbers database.

Many signed calls still reach end users, just flagged, not blocked; gateway carrier enforcement exists, but scammers rotate upstream providers faster than FCC actions land; VoIP providers historically had easy access to numbering, enabling large-scale abuse before recent tightening; carriers have been reluctant to block aggressively due to litigation risk, political backlash, and liability concerns; large robocall campaigns can scale nationally before meaningful enforcement kicks in; and the US sustains a large domestic robocall and lead-generation industry that keeps call volume structurally high.

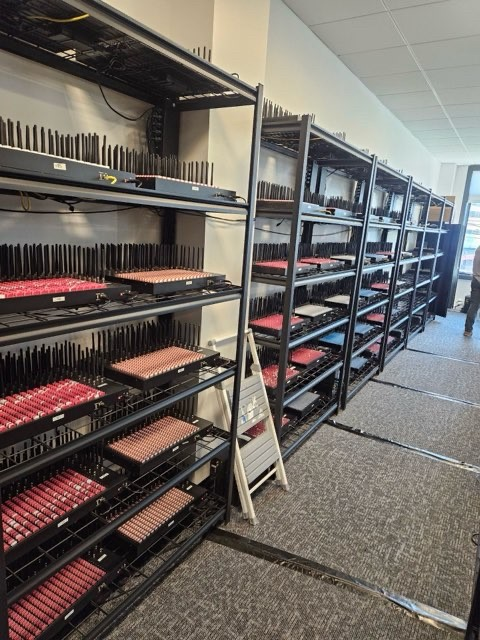
A SIM farm seized by the Secret Service

== Implementation ==
In March 2020, the FCC required all originating and terminating voice service providers to implement STIR/SHAKEN in the Internet Protocol portions of their networks by June 2021. The FCC also set rules to designate and oversee one neutral, private-led consortium to conduct robocall traceback and set neutrality, competence, and best-practice requirements. In July 2020, they selected USTelecom's Industry Traceback Group as the robocall traceback consortium. In September 2020, the FCC required voice and intermediate providers to deploy STIR/SHAKEN and establish extension/exemption and certification processes with robocall mitigation and traceback obligations for noncompliant traffic. In December 2020, the FCC required providers to better police their networks against illegal calls, expanded its existing call blocking safe harbor to cover network-based blocking of certain calls, and adopted transparency and redress requirements.

In June 2021, the FCC established an online portal and formal intake mechanism so they can receive higher-quality, faster intelligence from companies and organizations that observe large-scale robocall or spoofing activity. In May 2022, the FCC adopted the Gateway Provider Order that required gateway carriers, which are the point of entry for foreign calls into the US, to implement STIR/SHAKEN to stop illegal robocalls that originate overseas. On 16 March 2023, the FCC enhanced and expanded provider obligations to implement the STIR/SHAKEN caller ID authentication framework. In May 2023, the FCC extended the 24-hour traceback requirement to cover all voice service providers and expanded traffic blocking requirements for originating providers. In September 2023, the FCC strengthened requirements for Voice over IP (VoIP) providers to obtain direct access to telephone numbers. In February 2025, the FCC broadened the use of do-not-originate lists to block calls highly likely to be illegal.

== Legislative history ==
Several House bills introduced in early 2019, including H.R. 1602 and H.R. 2015, advanced substantially the same text, reflecting early bicameral alignment on a comprehensive approach to robocall enforcement. Other House measures addressed narrower aspects of the problem, such as traceback authority, one-ring scams, enhanced criminal penalties, and healthcare-related robocalls, while related Senate legislation focused on modernizing FCC reporting and oversight.

S. 151 was introduced by Sen. Markey in January 2019, and referred to the Senate Committee on Commerce, Science, and Transportation. The committee reported the bill with amendments in May 2019, and the Senate passed it on May 23 by a vote of 97–1. The bill was then sent to the House and referred to the Subcommittee on Communications and Technology. On December 4, the House passed the amended bill under suspension by a vote of 417–3. The Senate agreed to the House amendment by voice vote on December 19, and the bill was signed into law on December 30 by President Trump.

== Criticism ==
The act requires FCC referrals to DOJ for willful robocall fraud. In the half-decade since enactment, with billions of scam calls and billions of dollars in consumer losses, the FCC made less than a dozen referrals. In December 2025, the FCC again reported that it and DOJ had collected zero criminal fines or forfeitures tied to violations since enactment.

== See also ==
- Truth in Caller ID Act of 2009
- Telephone Consumer Protection Act of 1991

== General references ==
- Figliola, Patricia Moloney (10 April 2020). Federal Communications Commission: Progress Protecting Consumers from Illegal Robocalls (Report). Congressional Research Service.
