= Message-waiting indicator =

Feature to notify telephone user of waiting voicemail

In telephony, a message-waiting indicator (MWI) is a Telcordia Technologies (formerly Bellcore) term for an FSK-based telephone calling feature that illuminates an LED on selected telephones to notify a telephone user of waiting voicemail messages on most North American public telephone networks and PBXs.

A Message_Waiting_Indicator (MWI) is a mechanism that informs the subscriber about the status of recorded messages. The subscriber may subscribe to a notification feature that makes use of the status of this MWI.

== Difference to audible message waiting indicators ==
This feature is also frequently called (and abbreviated) as visual message waiting indicator (VMWI). A VMWI, as defined in Telcordia GR-1401-CORE, is a stored program controlled switching (SPCS) system feature that activates and deactivates a visual indicator on customer-premises equipment (CPE) to notify the customer that new messages are waiting. VMWI differs from existing features that use other message indicators, such as audible stuttered dial tone, in that it activates a visual indicator on the CPE. The visual indicator may be as simple as lighting or flashing a light-emitting diode (LED), or as advanced as displaying a special message on a liquid-crystal display (LCD).

This technology was invented by Jerome (Jerry) Schull and Wayne Howe at BellSouth's Advanced Technology R&D group in 1992 and was issued as US Patents #5,363,431 and #5,521,964. It was introduced in 1995, with the introduction of CLASS-based calling features and ADSI. It was at one time only compatible with ADSI-compliant telephones but is now compatible with any customer premises equipment (CPE) that simply responds visually to visual FSK.

== Use of similar indicator on standalone Caller ID set-top boxes ==
This service is often erroneously associated with the abilities of most Caller ID standalone set-top boxes. Caller ID boxes manufactured after 1998 feature an LED that blinks green to notify that new calls have been recorded and red to indicate that a subscriber has new voicemail messages waiting. Some units also display the text "MESSAGE WAITING" (similar to ADSI-compliant telephones). These units do not use visual FSK to activate their red LEDs, but instead, they briefly "pick-up" the line at certain intervals (normally, within two minutes of a new call) to check for a "stuttered" dial tone. The presence of a stutter dial tone activates a red LED; while absence deactivates it.

== Mobile telephony ==
For mobile phones, the message-waiting indicator is sent via a Short Message Service (SMS) message — the same system used for texting. (SMS was actually invented for utilitarian uses like this, not for user conversation.) It not only indicates that a message is waiting, but also how many unheard messages there are on the voicemail server for that telephone number. In the event that a phone is deactivated, out of range, or otherwise removed from the network, there is often no way to clear this indicator until another message is recorded to the system, causing the MWI message to be sent again once the phone reconnects. The customer service call center for the mobile network operator may also be able to provide simple technical support to reset this by resending the MWI message manually.
