= Neustar =

American technology company

Neustar, Inc.
- Website type: Subsidiary
- Founded: 1998; 28 years ago
- Headquarters: Sterling, Virginia, United States
- Key people: Charles E. Gottdiener (CEO)
- Industry: Telecommunications
- Revenue: ▲US$1.2 billion (2017)
- Operating income: ▲US$209,024,000 (2011)
- Net income: ▲US$160,823,000 (2011)
- Total assets: US$1,382,638,000 (2011)
- Total equity: US$502,634,000 (2012)
- Employees: 1,800 (2012)
- Parent: TransUnion (2021–present)
- Website: www.home.neustar
- ASN: 12008

Neustar, Inc. is an American technology company that provides real-time information and analytics for risk, digital performance, defense, telecommunications, entertainment, and marketing industries, and also provides clearinghouse and directory services to the global communications and Internet industries. Neustar was the domain name registry for a number of top-level domains, including .biz, .us (on behalf of United States Department of Commerce), .co, .nyc (on behalf of the city of New York), and .in (on behalf of the National Internet Exchange of India) until the sale of the division to GoDaddy in 2020.

Until the end of 2018, Neustar was also a North American Numbering Plan Administrator under behalf of the Federal Communications Commission, a role continued from its founder, Lockheed Martin. Their first contract was granted in 1997 and was renewed under its spin-off in 1999, 2004, and 2012. Since 2019, it has been replaced by Somos, Inc.

== History ==
Neustar was founded in Delaware in 1998 as a business unit within Lockheed Martin Corporation. It was spun off to keep the neutrality that was essential to its original core contract with the nation's telecommunications providers. In November 2006, it bought Followap, Inc., a UK-based enabler of mobile instant messaging services.

In 2010, Lisa Hook was named the firm's president and Chief Operating Officer. In January 2010, The Washington Post reported that under Hook's leadership, Neustar was chosen by a consortium of Hollywood studios and technology executives to manage a system where consumers could access movies and other video entertainment from multiple digital devices. This system was named "UltraViolet". Over the next years, Neustar bought several companies including, TARGUSInfo (2011), Aggregate Knowledge (2013) and .CO Internet (2014).

Neustar entered into an asset purchase agreement in 2015 with Transaction Network Services for their caller authentication assets. The following year, Neustar planned to split into two independent publicly traded companies. This plan was abandoned later that year when Golden Gate Capital and GIC announced to buy all Neustar public shares for approximately $2.9 billion ($33.50 per share). This was completed by August 2017.

Neustar lost its Number Portability Administration Center (NPAC) contract in 2016 to Ericsson subsidiary Telcordia. Neustar had administered the number portability system since 1997. The local-number-portability administrator (LNPA) was created to handle NPAC, which enables users to take their phone numbers with them when they switch service providers. The NPAC manages the routing of all calls and texts for more than 650 million US and Canadian phone numbers for more than 2,000 carriers.

Charles Gottdiener was appointed as president and chief executive officer, succeeding Lisa Hook in July 2018. In October, Neustar announced that it bought Verisign's security services customer contracts. This includes DDoS protection, DNS firewall, and managed and recursive DNS services customer contracts. Three months later, Neustar bought TRUSTID, a caller authentication and fraud prevention systems provider for contact centers.

GoDaddy bought Neustar's domain name registry business in August 2020, which was then renamed GoDaddy Registry. In late 2021, TransUnion purchased Neustar's main business for 3.1 billion. However, Neustar's security business, Neustar Security Services, was excluded from the transaction and was sold separately to become a portfolio company of Golden Gate Capital and GIC, and was rebranded as Vercara in April 2023. On September 23, 2024, DigiCert acquired Vercara.

== Business ==
From 1998 until 2015, the original business of Neustar was the administration of the North American Numbering Plan, the maintenance of the system of directories and databases that manage the telephone area codes and central office prefixes in North America. This enables the routing of calls among thousands of competing communications service providers (CSPs). Neustar also provided clearinghouse services to emerging CSPs, including Internet service providers (ISPs), mobile network operators, cable television operators, and voice over Internet protocol (VoIP) service providers.

Neustar offers internal and external managed Domain name system (DNS) services that play a role in directing and managing traffic in the Internet, cloud-based DDoS attack protection and website performance management tools. Before being purchased by Godaddy, Neustar managed the authoritative directories for the .us and .biz Internet domains, and acted as the worldwide "registry gateway" for China's .cn and Taiwan's .tw Internet domains outside of these two countries. Neustar also provided back end registry services for .co Top Level Domain.

Neustar previously operated the authoritative directory for U.S. Common Short Codes, part of the short messaging service (SMS) relied upon by the U.S. wireless industry, and provides solutions used by mobile network operators to enable mobile instant messaging for their end users. CTIA granted that contract to Iconectiv, who took over providing Common Short Code (CSC) Registry Services on January 1, 2016.

Neustar offered a "Digital Rights Locker" for Hollywood studios, consumer electronics manufacturers and retailers looking for Digital restrictions management, such as UltraViolet and the planned Mobile DTV Trust Authority (MDTV) Open Mobile Video Coalition (OMVC). UltraViolet was shut down on July 31, 2019.

== See also ==
- Communications Assistance for Law Enforcement Act
- Compuware
- Neotys
