= TRUSTID =

TRUSTID was a Portland, Oregon-based telephone authentication technology company led by CEO Patrick Cox. TRUSTID pioneered solutions that prevent Identity Interrogation technology. It was acquired by Neustar in 2014.
