= Identity interrogation =

Identity interrogation is a method of authentication or identity proofing that involves posing one or more knowledge-based authentication questions to an individual. Identity interrogation questions such as "What is your mother’s maiden name?" or "What are the last four digits of your social security number?" It is a method businesses use to prevent identity theft or impersonation of customers.

Identity interrogation is primarily employed during remote, not in-person interactions, such as with a teller at a bank. Many interactions that require user authentication over the Internet or the telephone employ Identity interrogation as a substitute for stronger authentication methods such as physical ownership authentication (i.e. presenting a driver's license or a bankcard), or biometrics (i.e. fingerprint or facial recognition) available mainly during in-person interactions. Identity interrogation is used to assist with risk management, account security, and legal and regulatory compliance during remote interactions. In addition, the technique was developed to assist in the prevention of identity fraud, or the illegal use of another person's identity to commit fraud or other criminal activities.

Identity interrogation methods are most commonly used by governments, organizations and companies such as banks or financial intermediaries, credit card companies, internet providers, telecommunications companies, insurance providers and others.

== See also ==
- TRUSTID
