= Pakistan MNP Database =

Pakistan MNP Database (Guarantee) Limited is a subsidiary of all the four Cellular Mobile Operators of Pakistan, which maintains the country's Central Number Portability Clearing House.

== History ==
Pakistan Mobile Number Portability Database (Guarantee) Limited (PMD) was incorporated in 2005 under the Companies Ordinance, 1984 after the launch of MNP in Pakistan pursuant to the ‘Mobile Number Portability Regulations, 2005’ under S.R.O 763 (2005).

Pakistan is the first country in South Asia to implement Mobile Number Portability.

Telenor was the first operator in Pakistan to secure 1 million subscribers through MNP.

In 2021, SECP's eServices integrated with Pakistan Mobile Number Portability (MNP) Database (Guarantee) Limited.
