= Telemarketing fraud =

Type of fraud

Telemarketing fraud is fraudulent selling conducted over the telephone. The term is also used for telephone fraud not involving selling.

Telemarketing fraud is one of the most persuasive deceptions identified by the Federal Trade Commission (FTC). Telemarketing fraud often involves some sort of victim compliance whether it involves the victim initiating contact with the perpetrator or voluntarily providing their private information to the offender; thus, fraud victims may experience feelings of shame and embarrassment that may prevent them from reporting their victimization.

Older people are disproportionately targeted by fraudulent telemarketers. According to FTC data for 2025, phone calls were the contact method with the highest total reported losses among people aged 80 and over.

Reports from adults 60 and older losing $10,000 or more to business and government imposter scams increased more than fourfold between 2020 and 2024, with phone calls as the contact method in 41% of cases.

Many older people have money to invest and are in need of profit. Also, they are less likely to report the fraud because they don't believe that consumer complaints would be solved.

== Types of fraud ==
- Advance fee fraud – They will typically require upfront payments in exchange for goods and services. This is also a popular technique used in lottery and student scholarships scams. Once the target has provided their personal information, the fraudsters will ask them to pay various fees – for example: taxes, legal fees, banking fees, etc. – so that they can release their non-existent winnings.
- Pyramid schemes – Work by recruiting “members” to invest into a scheme. Most of the money is made by recruiting new members and a prime characteristic of the scam is the product is of little value. The people at the bottom of the pyramid pay the people at the top. Inevitably they will run out of new recruits and the scheme will collapse. Some individuals may profit from pyramid schemes, but the vast majority of those who join later on in the scheme will not.
- Credit card fraud – Fraudsters will call with promises to repair their credit ratings, provide credit options or credit facilities, credit cards with zero or very low interest, or instant and unlimited loans without credit checks or security. Such offers, if followed up, tend to come at a considerable cost to victims in terms of high interest rates or exorbitant fees. It is common for scammers to target people who have bad credit and are therefore more susceptible to take the offer in hopes to pay off debts or to increase their credit rating.
- Overpayment fraud – One of the most popular scams making the rounds. A generous overpayment is made to the victim typically using a fake cheque. This can vary in goods but is popular among online auctions or classifieds. But before the cheque has been cleared by a bank and the victim discovers that the cheque has bounced, the scammer will request to have the difference refunded. Usually done through an online banking transfer, pre-loaded money card, or a wire transfer, such as Western Union. Therefore, victims lose the money they send along with the item itself.
- Charity fraud – Telemarketers claiming to represent charities call asking the target for a donation. Fake charities try to take advantage of people's generosity and compassion for others in need. Scammers will steal the money by posing as a genuine charity; they may try to use recent events, such as natural disasters, to make their phony pleas for donations sound more believable. These scammers use aggressive high pressure techniques made to make the victim feel guilty or selfish if they do not want to donate.
- Cramming – Small charges that are secretly inserted into customers' credit card bills for services they did not order, buried so deep in credit card bills that many do not notice, usually with fake fees by vague financial services. Sometimes a one-time charge for entertainment services will be crammed onto phone bills. Other times it may be a recurring monthly charge. Cramming of recurring charges falls into two general categories: club memberships, such as psychic clubs, personal clubs, or travel clubs; and telecommunications products or service programs, such as voice mail, paging, and calling cards.
- Summer jobs fraud – Much like an advance fee fraud, these scams are aimed at teenagers or young adults looking for work over the summer period. Telemarketers seek out the victims by scanning student job searches. The telemarketer will then claim the victim has been singled out and specially selected to be hired for a particular job. Before they can start work, however, they are told that they have to pay various fees to cover training, materials, and insurance. When they eventually realize the job is a scam, it is already too late and they have lost the money they paid for in fees as well as the time it would take to find a new job.
- Office supply scam – A very common scam where a telemarketer will target business managers responsible for purchasing office supplies, falsely representing their identity and the cost of office supplies – the most popular being toner. The caller might mislead a company's employees into thinking that an order for office supplies has already been placed, either by an existing or former colleague, and that they are calling to chase up a signature for the order form to help them keep complete records. The company is then invoiced for unwanted, and overpriced, stationery and office supplies.
- Magazine subscriptions scam - Scammers call victims with an intriguing offer and that for a small payment they can get a yearly subscription to their favorite magazine, even though they have no affiliation with the magazine's publisher. When victims agree, the scammers will send random magazines with grossly inflated prices. Another way they extract money is by falsely telling callers it is time to renew their magazine subscriptions in an attempt to get their credit or bank account information.
- Harassing/Stalking

== Telemarketing fraud tools ==
- Caller I.D. spoofing - Allows the caller to present any number they want to put up on the screen including existing numbers while keeping the real number they call from private. Caller I.D. spoofing is a low cost option to help ensure anonymity. The same devices can also change voices to sound like a male or female.
- Robocalls - Technology has made it cheap and easy for robocallers to make calls from anywhere in the world. Most of these calls originate overseas, many in boiler rooms in India, and they are surprisingly effective. Robocalls have been used for legitimate campaigning and public opinion polling, but have also been used for voter suppression, false endorsements, and negative campaigning that borders on fraud. The federal regulatory regime currently excludes political robocalls from most telemarketing regulations. Presidential campaigns and national interest groups have accidentally violated state laws in trying to communicate with voters by using robocalls.
- Crawler devices - The FTC reported about $16 billion in fraud losses of all types in 2025. Imposter scams, the most reported fraud category that year, reached people by phone as well as by text, email and social media. Some callers have to make up to 1000 calls per day. To help with speeding things up, they will sometimes use crawler devices which is computerized to go through every area code calling each number. If the caller does not reach, they mark the lead as "no answer" and the system programs it so they get called again a few days later. If the company does not have a large lead pool, they may get called as soon as 12 hours later. As with email spammers, they know that a certain proportion of their hits will score.
- False identity – Fraudulent telemarketers use aliases to cover their tracks and prevent detection from the law. Some fraudulent telemarketers are deliberately located in other countries, as it is more difficult for law enforcement agencies to pursue them. Typically, scammers will use common western names in a bid to reassure callers they are calling from the same country.

== Scam Identification and blocking software ==
Scam Likely is a term used for scam call identification, the term was originally coined by T-Mobile for the scam ID technology created by First Orion. First Orion's scam blocking technology uses a combination of known bad actors, AI powered blocking including neighborhood spoofing and unusual calling pattern. Scam Identification is a feature of the T-Mobile and Metro carrier network which can be controlled by the app Scam Shield, customer care or dialing the short code #664 to turn on or off scam blocking.

There are a number of phone apps which try to identify, screen, send to voicemail or otherwise deter telemarketing calls with most major carriers providing some level of free scam call screening. Additionally both iOS and Android operating systems offer scam screening options. In addition phone carriers may provide caller authentication using STIR/SHAKEN a caller authentication protocol designed to stop caller id spoofing by exchanging tokens between cellular carriers.

== Popular scams ==
Grandparent scam

A telephone call is made to an elderly person with a family member who is supposedly in some kind of trouble, usually claiming to be a grandson or granddaughter. These calls are often placed late at night or early in the morning when most people are not thinking as clearly. Callers assume that their targets have grandchildren and will usually have several other people in on the scam, such as a bail bondsman, the arresting police officer, a lawyer, a doctor at a hospital, or some other person. The first voice on the phone is usually by the scammer pretending to be the grandchild sounding upset and typically stating that there are only a few moments to talk. The caller may say that they have a cold if the victim does not recognize their voice. Their story generally follows a familiar line: they were traveling in another country with a friend, and after a car accident or legal infraction, they are in jail and need bail money wired to a Western Union account as soon as possible for their quick release. The caller does not want anyone told about the incident, especially not family. Before the victim can ask too much about the situation the phony child will hand the phone over to the accomplice who will then request money to be transferred to release the grandchild from jail. While this is commonly called the grandparent scam, criminals may also claim to be a family friend, a niece or nephew, or another family member.

Microsoft scam

A telephone call is made saying typically that virus activity has been detected on the victim's computer; the overseas caller then states they are from Microsoft or a Microsoft certified technician. Callers assume that the victim has a computer running a Microsoft Windows operating system (users of other operating systems, such as Linux, are a minority and are likely to be technically knowledgeable). They will get the computer owner to give the caller remote access using a genuine networking service or website like ammyy.com or TeamViewer. They will use the ‘Event Viewer’ tool on the computer to highlight the Red-X Errors and Yellow Warnings which are supposedly signs of an infection, when in fact these are normal and harmless logs. They also encrypt the owner's password database, preventing access to the computer without the scammers' password, essentially locking the victim out of their own computer and ensuring that they themselves will be paid. At this stage, the caller then has complete control over the computer and can display further alarming displays, as well as installing malware. The cold caller will then offer to remove the viruses and malicious malware (some of which they have installed themselves) and install security software and provide an ongoing support service costing up to $500. The Federal Trade Commission (FTC) has reported a huge crackdown on tech support scams and ordered a halt to several alleged tech support scams.

== Additional sources ==
- Competition Bureau of Canada and Royal Canadian Mounted Police (2006). "PhoneBusters: Recognize It". Archived from the original on November 26, 2006.
- United States Department of Justice (1998). "What Kinds Of Telemarketing Schemes Are Out There?". Archived from the original on 2007-02-10.
