= Mobile number portability =

Keeping a telephone number when switching mobile carriers

Mobile number portability (MNP) enables mobile phone users to retain a mobile telephone number when changing the mobile network operator.

== Overview ==
Mobile number portability (MNP) allows people to keep their phone numbers when switching to a new mobile network. Moreover, it has been implemented in various ways across the globe.

In most places, like Europe and many other countries, the process is "recipient-led." This means that when you want to switch to a new network, you contact the new network (the recipient). The new network then asks your current network (the donor) to transfer your number. This method is generally seen as straightforward for customers because they only need to interact with the new network. However, the UK and India have a different system known as "donor-led" porting. In these countries, you first need to contact your current network (the donor) to get a special code a Porting Authorization Code (PAC) in the UK or a Unique Porting Code (UPC) in India—which is to be submitted to the recipient network. The recipient continues the porting process by informing the recipient of that porting code. The method has been criticized by some industry analysts as being inefficient, though it prevents MNP scams. It has also been observed that it may act as customer deterrent as well as allowing the donor an opportunity to win back the customers. This might lead to distortion of competition, especially in the markets with new entrants that are yet to achieve scalability in operations. From 1 July 2019 as a result of new rules from Ofcom, In the UK a customer can request a PAC by simply texting "PAC" to 65075, making the process easier without needing to speak directly to the current provider.

== Technical details ==
A key technical aspect of Mobile Number Portability (MNP) involves the routing of calls or mobile messages (SMS, MMS) to a number once it has been ported. Various call routing implementations exist globally, but the International and European best practice employs a central database (CDB) of ported numbers. Network operators replicate the CDB and query it to determine the network to which a call should be directed. According to RFC 3482, this method, known as All Call Query (ACQ), is both efficient and scalable. The majority of established and emerging MNP systems worldwide rely on this ACQ/CDB method for call routing.

The United Kingdom is one of the few countries that does not use the ACQ/CDB approach. Instead, after a number is ported, calls are routed through the donor network, a method known as "indirect routing." This approach is inefficient as it wastes transmission and switching capacity. Additionally, indirect routing poses risks: if the donor network experiences a fault or ceases operations, customers with ported numbers will lose incoming calls. The UK telecoms regulator Ofcom completed its extended review of the UK MNP process on 29 November 2007, and mandated that ACQ/CDB be implemented for mobile-to-mobile ported calls by 1 September 2009. However, in 2010, Ofcom reversed this decision following objections from major UK telecom operators regarding the cost analysis of the mandate and a successful appeal by Vodafone in 2008.

Prior to March 2008, the minimum porting time in the UK was 5 working days, compared to 3.5 days in Pakistan, 2 hours in the United States, as quickly as 20 minutes in the Republic of Ireland, 3 minutes in Australia and a few seconds in New Zealand. On 17 July 2007, Ofcom concluded a review mandating a reduction of porting time to 2 working days effective 1 April 2008. Following consultations, Ofcom also mandated that near-instant (no more than 2 hours) recipient-led porting be implemented by 1 September 2009. However, Vodafone UK appealed this decision to the Competition Appeal Tribunal (CAT), which ruled in favor of Vodafone on 18 September 2008, returning the matter to Ofcom for reconsideration. On 8 July 2010, Ofcom issued a final statement retaining the donor-led process, mandating a two-hour PAC release time, and reducing the porting time from two working days to one working day.

In decentralized MNP models, a Flexible Number Register (FNR) may be used to manage a database of ported-out and ported-in numbers for call routing.

== Number lookup services ==
Service providers and carriers who route messages and voice calls to MNP-enabled countries might use home location register (HLR) query services to find out the correct network of a mobile phone number. A number of such services exist, which query the operator's HLR over the SS7 signaling network in order to determine the current network of a specified mobile phone number prior to attempted routing of messaging or voice traffic. These number lookup services can access the centralized database where the details related to each phone number subscribe is present who has been authorized to use the GSM network.

== Impact on mobile carriers and customers ==
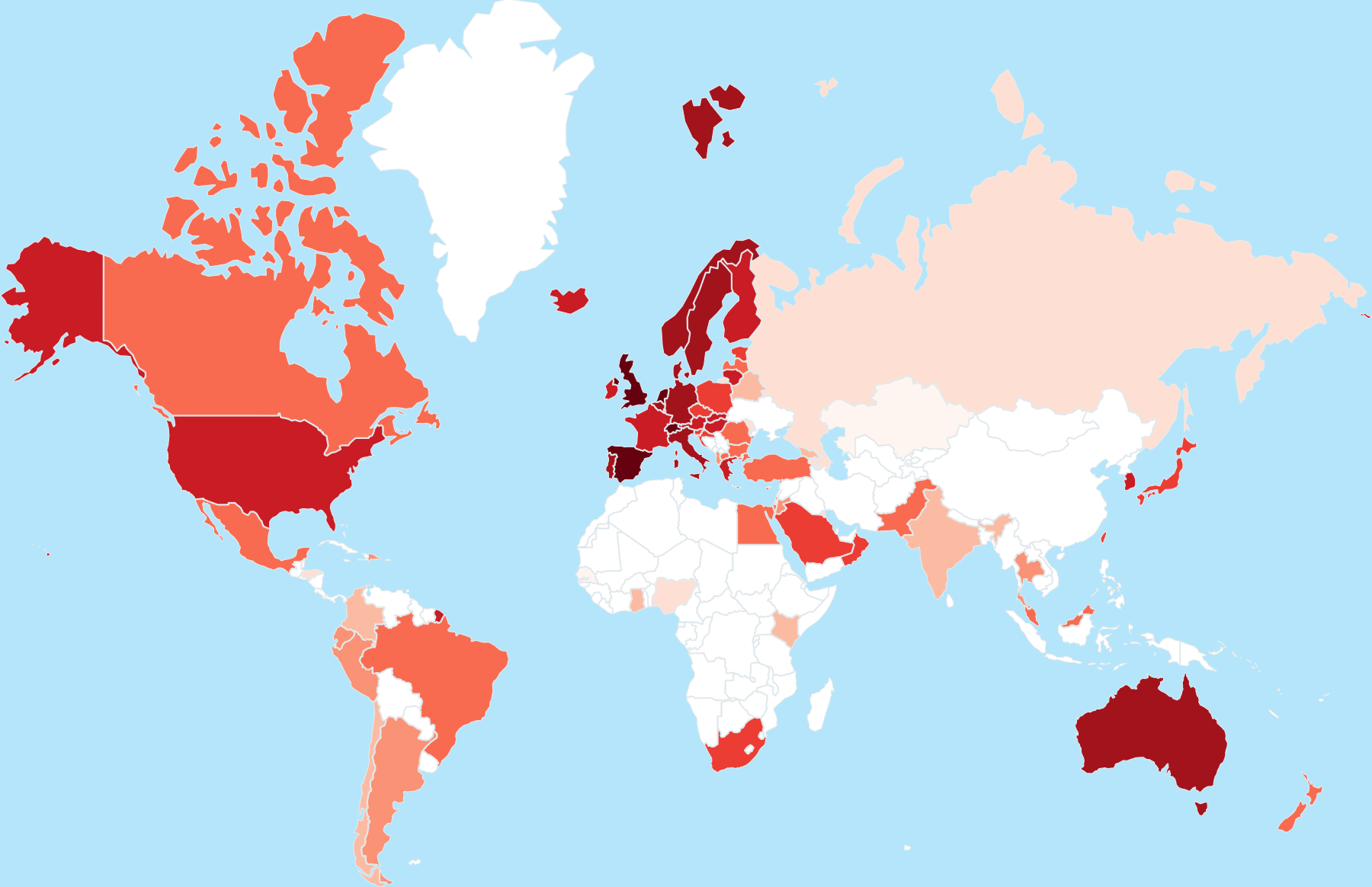
MNP map by implementation time

Mobile Number Portability (MNP) is crucial for telecom markets as it eliminates a significant barrier to switching, particularly for users who place high value on their numbers, such as business users. By reducing the obstacles to switching, MNP benefits challenger carriers in competition with dominant incumbents. Typically, the implementation of MNP in a country results in an increase in customer churn.

The experience of portability can differ significantly from country to country. For instance, in Portugal, any call to a ported mobile number is accompanied by an announcement indicating that the number has been ported. The uptake of porting varies considerably across markets. According to a report by the Irish regulator Comreg, over 3 million mobile numbers were ported in Ireland between 2004 and 2013. In contrast, Portugal, which has a much larger population of mobile users, saw just over one million numbers ported during a similar timeframe.

=== The Americas ===
Country	Implementation date yyyy.mm.dd	Time to port days	Price	Short notes	References
Argentina	2010.08.17	1–5 days	Free	The plan started in August 2010. Number Portability Clearinghouse service is handled by iconectiv.	
Bolivia	2018.10.01	1	Free	The process take more working days on postpaid services	
Brazil	2008.09.01	0–3	Free	The plan started in March 2007	
Canada	2007.03.14	0	Free	MNP procedure takes 10–20 minutes.	
Colombia	2011.07.29	0	Free	On 1 July 2020, the time taken for the MNP procedure to take effect was reduced from 3 days to under 24 hours, the customer might also pick a specific date for the MNP procedure be carried out.	
Chile	2012.01.16	1	Free	The process takes place overnight. Number Portability Clearinghouse service is handled by iconectiv.	
Dominican Republic	2009.09.30	3–10	Free		
Ecuador	2009.10.12	4	Free	ASCP handled by Systor, Telconet and JR Electric Supply	
El Salvador	2015.08.24	0	Free	The NP Central data base (NPCDB) "NUMLEX" was developed and installed by Mediafon Datapro, administered by Mediafon Datapro and "imCard S.A. de C.V." . MNP procedure takes up to 8 hours, FNP – 3 days.	
Honduras	2014.04.30	0	Free	MNP procedure takes 1 hour.	
Mexico	2008.07.05 2019.09.01			In 2019 September Mediafon de Mexico successfully replaced old solution by modern Numlex NPCDB platform. Previously the service was handled by iconectiv and Neoris.	
Paraguay	2012.11.30	Up to 8 working days	Free	MNP can take up to 8 working days but usually takes no longer than 1–2 working days. Switching occurs between 1 am and 5 am.	
Peru	2010.01.01	7–9	Free	sim card of the new mobile company that will cost around 15 PEN.	
United States	2003.11.24	0	Free	iconectiv manages the Number Portability Administration Center (NPAC), the largest number portability system in the world. Consisting of seven regional systems, the NPAC facilitates number porting across all Service Providers in the United States.	
Uruguay	2021.01.12	1–5 days	Free	Cleartech manages the Portability Database Administration (ABD - Administrador de la Base de Datos)	

=== Central Asia ===
Country	Implementation date yyyy.mm.dd	Time to port days	Price	Short notes	References
Kazakhstan	2016.01.01	5	Free	The NP Central data base (NPCDB) "NUMLEX" was developed and installed by Mediafon Datapro, administrated by national NPCDB Administrator.	

=== Asia Pacific ===
Country	Implementation date yyyy.mm.dd	Time to port days	Price	Short notes	References
Australia	2001.09.25	0	Free	Previously prefixes 04x1, 04x2, 04x3 referred to Optus; 04x4, 04x5 and 04x6 referred to Vodafone; 043x, referred to Vodafone Hutchison Australia formally known as Hutchison 3G Australia. 04x7, 04x8, 04x9 and 0410x referred to Telstra; Some carriers may charge a fee for porting out. MNP takes around 10 to 20 minutes	
Bangladesh	2018.10.01	7	$0.43 50 BDT Fee and 200 BDT SIM replacement Tax and VAT. Total amount is 256 BDT.	Number portability is available nationwide, "Infozillion BD-Teletech Consortium" provided the MNP. customer should have completed a period of 90 days (from the date of activation of the mobile connection) with the current operator, to be eligible for porting to another operator. Similarly, after porting to a new provider the number would be locked in for 90 days. GrameenPhone, Robi, Airtel-bd, Banglalink all operator can port own Number. The duration for the process is 7 days and the time a number is deactivated for portability is about 2 hours.	
China (mainland)	Phase I: 2010.11 (in Tianjin and Hainan); Phase II: 2018.12 (Phase I and Jiangxi, Hubei and Yunnan provinces); Phase III: 2019.11.10 (all provinces, officially on 2019.12.01)	<1 (1~2 hours as in Phase II)	Free (but as per the 4th requirement on right, sometimes cancellation of contract services may take some fees)	No MVNO, satellite and IoT numbers are accepted due to technical challenges. No changes on home territory when doing MNP. MNP requests may only accepted if and when the phone numbers: 1. Are identified with real name 2. Are not in reported-the-loss or halted mode 3. Have not owed phone bills 4. Have no limits on contract services 5. Have linked with the previous carrier for 120 days	
Hong Kong	1999.03.01	2	Free	Service handled by Office of the Communications Authority (OFCA). In the network, you may be charged unexpectedly for a call to a mobile that has been ported form a different network.	
India	2011.01.20	3	₹6.46 (if requested by operator)	Number portability is available nationwide, provided the customer should have completed a period of 90 days (from the date of activation of the mobile connection) with the current operator, to be eligible for porting to another operator. Similarly, after porting to a new provider the number would be locked in for 90 days. Number Portability Clearinghouse service is handled by iconectiv. The duration for the process is 3 days and the time a number is deactivated for portability is about 2 hours.	
Japan	2006.10.24	1	JPY 3000		
Malaysia	2008.10.01	1	Free	1 day is a minimum time necessary for porting. Number Portability Clearinghouse service is handled by iconectiv.	
Maldives	2016.03.10	2	MVR 200	Number portability is allowed within a circle. The customer should have completed a period of 90 days (from the date of activation of the mobile connection) with the current operator and any outstanding bills should be cleared, to be eligible for porting to another operator. Although the duration for the process is 2 days for total process but the time a number is deactivated for portability is 2 hours only.	
New Zealand	2007.04.01				
Pakistan	2007.03.23	4	Free	Customers can port between prepaid and postpaid options. On porting IN, the recipient company provides, free credit and airtime. The service is handled by Pakistan MNP Database (Guarantee) Limited, the joint venture of all the cellular companies of Pakistan. Number Portability Clearinghouse service is handled by iconectiv.	
Philippines	2021.09.30	2	Free		
Singapore	2008.06.13	1	Free	Customers are not able to port between prepaid and postpaid options. Vendor for database installation is Syniverse Technologies	
South Korea	2004.07.12				
Taiwan	2005.10.13	1	TWD 112		
Thailand	2010.12.15	2	Free	Number Portability Clearinghouse services were previously handled by iconectiv. 2 days can be just working days.	
Vietnam	2018.11.16 (postpaid) 2019.01.01 (prepaid)	2	60,000 VND (postpaid) 50,000 VND (prepaid)	Number Portability Clearinghouse service is handled by iconectiv.	

=== Europe ===
Country	Implementation date yyyy.mm.dd	Time to port days	Price	Short notes	References
Albania	2010.12.22	TBA	TBA	Agreement signed on 2010-12-22 between AKEP (Authority of Electronic and Postal Communications) and the service handling company "INFOSOFT SYSTEMS sh.a.". Service not implemented yet.	
Armenia	2014.04.01				
Austria	2004.10.16	3	Free		
Azerbaijan	2013.08.01	3	Free	From 1 January 2013 NPCDB in Azerbaijan is administrated by Mediafon Datapro, the company of Mediafon group, which has won international rebid for NPCDB administration in Azerbaijan in 2013. Mediafon Datapro successfully replaced old solution by modern Numlex NPCDB platform.	
Belarus	2012.02.01	1	Free		
Belgium	2002.10.01	2	Free	The central solution CRDC has been re-implemented several times. Originally, it was implemented by iconectiv US, then by Cap Gemini Sweden and Belgium, and the third time by Porthus Belgium. Access to DB: setup fee : €11 000, annual fee: €3000. Before, the prefixes 047x was for Proximus phones, 048x for Base and 049x for Orange	
Bosnia and Herzegovina	2013.01.01	3	Free		
Bulgaria	2008.04.11	2	EUR 2.56		
Croatia	2006.10.01	5		5 days is maximum possible period necessary for porting a number. Service handled by HAKOM.	
Cyprus	circa 2004.07	2	Free		
Czechia	2006.01.15	4		Before 2013-09-01 it was 30 days to transfer, now just 4 days	
Denmark	2001.07.??	1	DKK 0–29	The central solutions is called OCH – Operators Clearing House. Before 2009 it was 30–60 days to transfer number, now just 1 day	
Estonia	2005.01.01	7			
Finland	2003.07.25	5	Free	Handled by the company Numpac	
France	2003.06.30	3	Free	Heavily improved since November 2011 with a 3-days maximum lead time (was taking 2 months in most cases before 2007, then 10 days)	
Georgia	2011.01.01		Free	From 1 January 2017 NPCDB in Georgia is administrated by Mediafon Datapro, the company of Mediafon group, which has won international rebid for NPCDB administration in Georgia in 2016. Mediafon Datapro successfully replaced old solution by modern Numlex NPCDB platform.	
Germany	2002.11.01	1	Free		
Greece	2003.09.??	3	Free	Service is handled by iconectiv.	
Hungary	2004.05.01	8	Free		
Iceland	2004.10.01	10	Free	10 days is maximum possible period.	
Ireland	2003.07.25	0	Free	Full mobile number portability in Ireland is a very simple and rapid process, driven by the customer. The request is made to the new operator, then automatically confirmed by SMS or a voice call using a code. It normally completes within a few minutes. Many operators can process requests automatically online through their websites. Requests can occasionally take longer, but usually no more 24 hours. Volumes of ported mobile numbers are reported in the Comreg quarterly report Before 2003, partial mobile number portability was available. Customers retained the last 7-digits of their mobile number, but changed operator prefix. Callers to the old prefix would hear an automatic announcement advising them of the new number. This service was introduced in 1997 and replaced by full portability in 2003. Where an Irish number is ported, mobile callers will hear a 'chirp' tone if they are calling a number that is not on its original network. This alerts them that call charges other networks may apply. Service handled by PortingXS via the Inports Number Portability System.	
Italy	2002.04.01	1	Free (1 to €1.6 if the subscriber wants to transfer their prepaid credit to the new carrier)	The maximum time for the procedure is 24 working hours. In case of delay up to 3 working days no refund is given, if the delay is longer than 3 days user receive a refund of €2.5 for each day of delay, start counting from day 1.	
Latvia	2007.??.??	10	Free		
Lithuania	2004.01.01	28		From 2016.01.01 (after rebid in 2015) NPCDB administrator VsI "Numerio perkelimas" manages NPCDB solution NUMLEX developed and installed by Mediafon. Time to port – 1 day	
Luxembourg	2005.02.01	1		Managed by the G.I.E Telcom E.I.G. operator group and developed, installed and operated by Systor Trondheim AS.	
Malta	2005.07.31	0		4 hours is a period necessary to port a number.	
Moldova	2013.07.01	5–30	Free	Service handled by Mediafon Datapro. The NP Central data base (NPCDB) "NUMLEX" was developed, installed and supported by Mediafon Datapro, administrated by national NPCDB Administrator "NP Base"	
Netherlands	1999.04.??	3			
North Macedonia	2008.09.01			The reference database was developed, installed and is operated by Seavus Group.	
Norway	2001.04.01	5	NOK 0 – 200	Administrated by the National Reference Database (NRDB). The reference database was developed, installed and is operated by Systor Trondheim AS.	
Poland	2006.02.??		Free	To be administrated by the National Central Database (PLI-CBD) run by Office of Electronic Communications (UKE). 30-day max porting time is to be reduced to 1 day.	
Portugal	2002.01.01	5–10	Free	Operated by Portabil S.A. Solution implemented by Systor Trondheim AS of Norway.	
Romania	2008.10.21	3	Free	Developed by UTI Systems based on the Porthus implementation	
Russia	2013.12.01	8	RUR 0–100	CBDPN was installed.	
Serbia	2011.07.01	2	Free		
Slovakia	2004.05.01	4	Free	Portation request done in 5 days	
Slovenia	2005.12.31	5	EUR 5	5 EUR is a maximum possible price	
Spain	2000.10.??	1	Free	Central database managed through the AOPM (Asociación de Operadores para la Portabilidad Móvil).	
Sweden	2001.09.01	5–6	Free	The largest operators formed independent company, SNPAC AB, to procure central database (CRDB) solution. Implementation of CRDB is carried out by Cap Gemini & Oracle.	
Switzerland	2000.03.01	5	Free		
Turkey	2008.11.09	2–6	Free	AVEA and Vodafone hired Gantek to implement central database (CRDB) solution and donated it to Turkish Telecommunications Regulatory Authority. Number Portability Clearinghouse services were previously handled by iconectiv. SIM replacement required.	
Ukraine	2019.05.01	1	Free	Participants: 3Mob, Lifecell, Vodafone, Kyivstar, Intertelecom	
United Kingdom	2003.07.25	1	Free	Users in the United Kingdom are required to use a Porting Authorisation Code (PAC)	

=== Middle East and Africa ===
Country	Implementation date yyyy.mm.dd	Time to port days	Price	Short notes	References
Bahrain	2011.07.08		Free	Managed by the Systor Cntral System.	
Egypt	2008.04.07	24 hours	Free (may request 5 EGP for new MNP SIM fee), was charging 75 EGP before	NPC serves the centralized administrative and provisioning role of MNP, where Giza Systems is the system integrator. Cannot revert to existing operator before 4 months of service to new operator. Porting to another operator, line should be at least 4 months old. Number Portability Clearinghouse services were previously handled by iconectiv.	
Ghana	2011.07.07	typically 5–10 min., max 24 hours	Free	Central system operated by Porting Access Ghana, under authorisation from National Communications Authority	
Iran	2016.07.10	3–5	Free		
Israel	2007.12.03	up-to 30 minutes	Free	Service includes landline as well as mobile numbers	
Ivory Coast	2018			The NP Central data base (NPCDB) "NUMLEX" was developed and installed by Mediafon Datapro.	
Jordan	2010.??.??				
Kenya	2011.04.01		Free		
Kuwait	2013.06.15	1	Free	The Ministry of Telecommunications has launched the service on 2013-06-15. The project manager is the National Technology Enterprises Company www.ntec.com.kw	
Morocco	2019 ongoing deployment			In 2019 Mediafon Datapro will successfully implement modern Numlex NPCDB platform.	
Nigeria	2013.04.22	2	Free	NCC (Nigerian Communications Commission) has adopted a phased approach to the launch of Mobile Number Portability service in Nigeria. The process to port to CDMA networks will begin as soon as the GSM porting process is completed and launched. Mobile Number Portability will initially be available among the GSM mobile operators: MTN, GLOBACOM, ETISALAT, and AIRTEL. Number Portability Clearinghouse services were previously handled by iconectiv.	
Oman	2006.08.26			Implemented as a decentralized solution by Porthus for Nawras, and by Gulf Business Machines/Telcordia for Oman Mobile.	
Palestine	2020.09.20	1 hour	Free	Cannot revert to the existing operator before 3 months (for prepaid users)/6 months (for postpaid users) of service to the new operator.	
Qatar	2013.01.31	Maximum 1 working day – would be activated the successive day	Free, operator can impose SIM card charges if any	The National Numbering Committee, established by ictQATAR has taken care of the MNP management. Currently both Ooredoo and Vodafone Qatar allows Port in and Port out for Prepaid and Postpaid Services	
Saudi Arabia	2006.07.08		Free	Managed by the Centralized Clearinghouse Approach, The implementer and system integrator is Giza Arabia. Number Portability Clearinghouse services were previously handled by iconectiv.	
Senegal	2015.09.01	MNP goes nearly online, max −24 hours	Free	The NP Central data base (NPCDB) "NUMLEX" was developed and installed by Mediafon Datapro, administrated by Mediafon Datapro and Comet Afrique Telecoms . Only MNP.	
South Africa	2006.11.10			The three operators, Vodacom SA, MTN SA, and Cell C, formed an independent company for the implementation and management of the central solution. After delays, the implementation of this solution was awarded to local company Saab Grintek collaborating with iconectiv.	
Tanzania	2017.03.01		Free		
Tunisia	2016			The NP Central data base (NPCDB) "NUMLEX" was developed and installed by Mediafon Datapro, administrated by national NPCDB Administrator.	
UAE			Free	Number Portability Clearinghouse service is handled by iconectiv.	

== See also ==
- Local number portability
- Porting Authorisation Code
