= Call capture =

Technology capturing personal data from call/text inquiries

Call capture is the practice in the real estate industry of using interactive voice response systems to capture personal data from persons who inquire for information about a property for sale or rent. After the call is placed, the system notifies a client of the name and phone number of the person calling. The system is designed to generate leads.

== Sample service ==
Real estate agents for example might display their call capture phone number on signs, mailings, and their website. This may be a toll-free phone number with a code for the property. Information about a property is delivered via a phone call or provided by text message.

The assigned real estate agent receives a lead by email or text that a client is listening to a property presentation, or that a response text link has been sent on a particular property. The lead usually includes the caller ID of the inbound phone number, the name of the party associated to the incoming phone number and the property that was just inquired-on.
