= North American Numbering Council =

Advisory committee of the U.S. Federal Communications Commission

The North American Numbering Council is an advisory committee of the Federal Communications Commission (FCC) of the United States, chartered in 1995. Its function is to develop and recommend efficient and fair administrative procedures in the administration of the North American Numbering Plan (NANP), including telephone numbering plan policy and technical implementation. The council is headed by a Designated Federal Officer appointed by the FCC. It is renewed on a two-year term schedule pursuant to the Federal Advisory Committee Act, and meets approximately four times per year. Its work is structured and conducted in working groups. The committee reports to the FCC via the Wireline Competition Bureau.

The original charter of the North American Numbering Council was filed with the United States Congress on October 5, 1995. The charter is renewed periodically in accordance with the provisions of the Federal Advisory Committee Act (FACA). The council held its first meeting on October 1, 1996.

The North American Numbering Council advises the Federal Communications Commission in an oversight capacity over telephone numbering plan issues. Through consensus decisions of its members, the council recommends procedures, policies, and technical means for efficient numbering administration, impartial to any telecommunication industry interest group. The council develops policy for numbering issues and initially resolves disputes. It provides guidance to the North American Numbering Plan Administrator (NANPA).

== Working groups ==
The North American Numbering Council conducts several working groups in assistance of its advisory function to the FCC. As of 2020, the following working groups are established:

- Numbering Administration Oversight
- Call Authentication Trust Anchor
- Toll Free Assignment Modernization
- Nationwide Number Portability
- Interoperable Video Calling

== See also ==
- Number Portability Administration Center
- Telecommunications Act of 1996
- Communications Act of 1934
