= Analog display services interface =

Telephony technology for screen-based devices

Analog display services interface (ADSI) is a telephony technology that is used in plain old telephone service (POTS) or computer-based private branch exchange (PBX) telephone service. It works in conjunction with a screen-based telephone ("screenphone") or other compatible customer-premises equipment (CPE) to provide the user with soft key access to telephone company or internal PBX custom calling features. It is an analog service because it uses analog frequency-shift keying (FSK) technology to interact with an LCD screen via short, low-baud rate, downloads to refresh and re-program soft keys in real-time.

The technology introduced in the United States and rolled out to Regional Bell Operating Companies (RBOCs) from Bellcore in April 1995, (very soon after the introduction of CLASS-based services through electronic switching system (ESS)), was marketed by the RBOCs who implemented it, as a way to streamline all available custom calling options through the use of a screen-based telephone; giving residential and small business telephone subscribers PBX-like functionality at home or in small office/home office (SOHO) locations at a significantly lower cost. The service debuted before the onslaught of personal communications service (PCS) and voice over Internet protocol (VoIP)-based telephony technologies became available and was originally slated to also work in conjunction with other types of services such as enhanced directory assistance, telephone banking, movie theatre ticket sales, and other services that could interact with an LCD-screen.

Some of those services did become available later, though, not at the dramatic increase the US-based telephone companies had hoped. Canadian telephone companies such as Telus and Bell Canada, however, had much better luck implementing more ADSI-based services with other industries such as banking, and were still marketing the service actively as of 2005.

The service is marketed at telephone customers who subscribe to the majority of custom local area signaling services (CLASS)-based services offered by their local telephone company (such as caller ID, call return, etc.) by the customization of a telephone capable of providing one-touch access to these features. This greatly increases customer usability by alleviating the need to memorize dialing codes such as *69.

Additionally, a few RBOCs introduced new features such as call waiting deluxe and message waiting indicator to work exclusively with ADSI telephones. The former being perhaps the most involved example of ADSI capabilities and the latter being an example of visual FSK; another new technology available through CLASS.

The RBOCs who offer this service also restructured their billing of these services into value-based "packages" to stimulate customer interest.

== Compatible equipment ==
U S West Communications, the first local RBOC to offer this service, marketed it as "Home Receptionist" service. Home Receptionist service included a Nortel Powertouch (or Vista) 350 screen-based telephone and "line-provisioning" service to make it work. The service continued to be offered for a time by successors such as CenturyLink and AT&T, under different marketing names, before the broader phase-out of legacy analog telephone features.

Nortel discontinued the x5x telephone line and introduced a more streamlined version called the 39x-line and then later the 48x-line in 1998. CIDCo and Cybiotronics later introduced their own lines of screenphones after the original Nortel Patent expired.

Nortel sold off its CPE line to Aastra Technologies in 1999, which subsequently marketed these telephones through various channels.

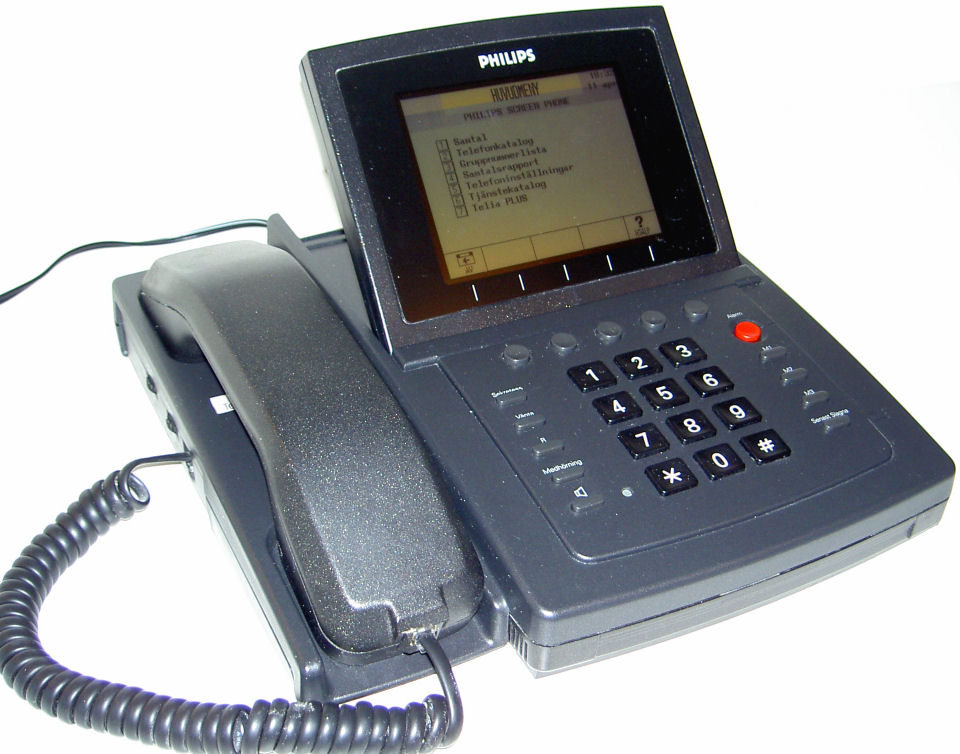
P100 Screenphone (Swedish version)

Philips Austria manufactured a screen phone model called the P100. It was sold throughout the US and several European countries.

== See also ==
- Session Initiation Protocol
- Simplified Message Desk Interface
