= Location routing number =

Identification for a telephone switch

A location routing number (LRN) is a 10-digit number which identifies a telephone switch for the purpose of routing telephone calls through the public switched telephone network (PSTN). This identifier has the format of a telephone number in accordance with the North American Numbering Plan (NANP). The association of a location routing number to ported telephone numbers is required for local number portability.

== Function ==
An LRN identifies a switch in the PSTN that serves a given telephone number. The Number Portability Administration Center (NPAC) in the U.S. and the Canadian Number Portability Administration Center (CANPAC) in Canada administer several databases known as local number portability (LNP) databases across many NPAC Regions. Each telephone number entered into the NPAC is known a subscription version and is stored in an LNP. The subscription version contains, among other information, the LRN of the switch that serves the telephone number.

When a telephone call is initiated, the initiating service provider's switch will query the LNP to check if the number has been ported (Sometimes referred to as an "LNP dip"). If the number has been ported, the LRN of the new switch is returned and the call is routed to that switch. If the number has not been ported, the call is routed based on the NPA-NXX prefix of the telephone number.

If a subscriber decides to port their telephone number to different service provider, the new and old service providers work together with the NPAC to confirm the port request and update the corresponding region(s) LNP database with the LRN of the new switch that is serving the number.

== History ==
In 1996, the US Congress passed the Telecommunications Act of 1996 which made it easier for smaller companies to enter the telephony, broadcasting, and cable television markets. The new regulation provided for local number portability, which permitted the servicing of telephone numbers from other wire centers than those given by the NPA-NXX prefixes of each number. In practice, a subscriber can keep a telephone number when moving to another exchange area by a process called porting a telephone number. Every ported telephone number has an LRN assigned.

Virginia-based Neustar was originally contracted with developing and maintaining the Number Portability Administration Center to support the implementation of local number portability. However, in July 2016, the FCC awarded the contract to administer NPAC to Ericsson subsidiary Telcordia Technologies, doing business as iconectiv, as the next Local Number Portability Administrator (LNPA), after 19 years of management by Neustar.

== See also ==
- Signalling System No. 7
