= Number Portability Administration Center =

The Number Portability Administration Center (NPAC) is a function of the Federal Communications Commission (FCC) in the United States. It administers the routing of telephone calls and text messages (SMS) for the telecommunications industry and its customers in the regions of the North American Numbering Plan. As such, it facilitates local number portability in the United States and Canada.

== History ==
The Telecommunications Act of 1996 (47 U.S.C. § 251(b)(2)) established that all local exchange carriers must implement local number portability (LNP) in accordance with the regulations of the Federal Communications Commission (FCC). Subsequently, the FCC selected Lockheed Martin as the LNP administrator.

The Number Portability Administration Center was originally implemented by the Communications Industry Services (CIS) division of Lockheed Martin in 1997. In 1998, Lockheed Martin formed a separate company, Neustar, for the management of the NPAC. At the time the work constituted the first database and registry to enable local number portability for the United States and Canada. The database contains the data for routing, rating, and billing telephone calls to telephone numbers that are no longer assigned to the telecommunication carrier that originally received the central office prefix or thousands-block allocation.

On March 26, 2015, the FCC approved the recommendation of the North American Numbering Council (NANC) to award the contract to Telcordia Technologies, doing business as iconectiv, as the next Local Number Portability Administrator (LNPA), after 18 years of management by Neustar. The reasons for the change were cited as cost savings. With commission oversight, North American Portability Management, LLC (NAPM) negotiated the terms of a Master service agreement (MSA) with iconectiv. The MSA was submitted to the FCC for review and approval in March 2016. The iconectiv contract was finalized in August 2016. iconectiv officially became the administrator of the NPAC on May 25, 2018.
