= Transaction Network Services =

Data communications company

- Type: Private
- Industry: Data communications
- Founded: 1990
- Headquarters: Reston, Virginia, United States
- Number of locations: 60+ countries
- Areas served: North America; South America; Europe; Asia-Pacific
- Key people: Mike Keegan; Mark Cole; Jim McLaughlin
- Revenue: $409.1 million (2019)
- Number of employees: 1500+
- Website: www.tnsi.com

Transaction Network Services (TNS) is a privately held, multinational company in the payments, financial and telecommunications industries. TNS is the supplier of networking, integrated data, and voice services to many organizations in the global payments and financial communities, as well as a provider of telecommunications network solutions to service providers.

== History ==
- 1990 – TNS founded in the US to provide services to the point-of-sale/payments industry
- 1994 – Initial public offering – NASDAQ listed
- 1995 – TNS' Telecommunications Services division launched
- 1996 – International offices launched in the UK, Canada and Ireland and TNS' Financial Services division launched
- 1998 – Acquired AT&T's Transaction Access Service (USA)
- 1999 – Offices opened in Australia, France and Japan. Processing services launched in the UK. Listed on the NYSE.
- 1999 – Acquired by PSINet for $705 million (US$1.1 Billion (2019))
- 2000 – Office opened in Spain
- 2001 – Management, in conjunction with private equity firm GTCR Golder Rauner LLC, bought back TNS from PSINet
- 2002 – Office opened in Italy
- 2003 – Acquired Openet (Italy) and Transpoll Offline (UK)
- 2004 – Initial Public Offering – NYSE listing
- 2005 – Acquired Connect Ro (Romania)
- 2006 – Offices opened in India, Thailand and South Korea. Acquired Comms XL (UK), InfiniRoute Networks Inc. (USA), Sonic Inc. (USA) and JPG Telecom SAS (France)
- 2007 – Acquired Dialect Payment Technologies (Australia)
- 2008 – Offices opened in Hong Kong and Singapore
- 2009 – Acquired Verisign's Communication Services Group (USA)
- 2010 - Acquired Cequint - a mobile Caller ID company.
- 2013 – Office opened in Taiwan. TNS acquired by Siris Capital Group LLC in a take-private transaction
- 2015 – Sells Call Authentication assets to Neustar
- 2016 – Received investment led by Koch Equity Development LLC
- 2017 – Offices opened in New Zealand and the Philippines
- 2018 – Acquired Advam
- 2019 – Acquired Link Solutions (Brazil), OpSiSe (France), and R2G (Chicago)
- 2021 – Acquired by Koch Equity Development LLC
- 2022 – Acquired AGNITY Global, Inc.; First Orion and Hiya joined Neustar and TNS to develop enterprise call authentication standards.
- 2023 – Acquired BornTec's managed hosting and colocation business.; Acquired West Highland Support Services.
- 2024 – Opened AI Labs Poland.
