= Migration Authorisation Code =

Unique identifier code for switching ISPs in the UK

In the United Kingdom a Migration Authorisation Code (MAC) was a 17 to 19-character unique identifier code used by DSL customers when they wish to switch internet service provider (ISP). A MAC is generated by the actual telecommunication provider (most commonly BT), identifies the local loop (telephone line) to be switched, and authorises the provider to switch the customer to the new ISP.

MACs usually begin with "BBIP", "FTIP", "BBDS", or "BBDP", and consist of 4 letters, 7 digits (sometimes up to 9), a slash, 2 letters, 2 digits (this indicates the day in the month the MAC was issued), and 1 final letter. (For example: BBIP87654321/AB12C).

== Background ==
After a request for a MAC it should be provided by the ISP within five working days. MACs are valid for 30 days once issued, providing the customer with the opportunity of switching ISPs within that period. It usually takes around three to ten working days for accounts to be switched over from one ISP to another.

The code was first introduced by Ofcom and BT as a voluntary code of practice. However, as of 14 February 2007, the rule became compulsory (General Condition No. 22: Service Migrations). This meant that if a broadband customer requested a MAC from their ISP then the provider must supply one free of charge. The rules were implemented in order to ease the process of switching ISPs. Switching customers will usually only lose their Internet connection for up to a few hours during the migration.

As of 20 June 2015 the MAC code is no longer required to enable switching of ISPs. A customer who wishes to change broadband provider now only needs to request the service from the gaining provider.

== Reasons for refusal ==
The grounds on which an ISP may refuse to issue a MAC are:

- The ISP is unable to confirm the identity of the account holder by performing standard checks
- The broadband service contract has already been terminated
- A valid MAC has already been requested and issued by the ISP
- The ISP has already submitted a cease request for the broadband service
- The underlying broadband network communications provider used by the ISP is unable to generate a MAC. In the UK the underlying broadband network communications provider is generally BT as they own the majority of the telecoms infrastructure.
- If the service is provided over an MPF or "fully unbundled" network (where the ISP provides Broadband, Line Rental and Calls together)
- Ofcom regulations only apply to individuals and businesses with fewer than 15 employees. The MAC request must be made by the end user.

== Problems ==
Some ISPs, such as Pipex were reported to be unwilling to provide MACs even if they have no reasonable grounds for refusal.

On at least one occasion, in a crisis situation, BT set up a help line to enable customers to get their MAC codes directly from BT Wholesale.

== See also ==
- Transfer secret
