= Interface standard =

In telecommunications, an interface standard is a standard that describes one or more functional characteristics (such as code conversion, line assignments, or protocol compliance) or physical characteristics (such as electrical, mechanical, or optical characteristics) necessary to allow the exchange of information between two or more (usually different) systems or pieces of equipment. Communications protocols are an example.

An interface standard may include operational characteristics and acceptable levels of performance.

In the military community, interface standards permit command and control functions to be performed using communication and computer systems.

== Telephones ==
There are many interface standards between analog telephone central office equipment and customer-premises equipment. Single voice paths generally include analog audio connections, either a two-wire circuit or four-wire circuit plus signaling paths to indicate call progress and status information, such as ringing, answer supervision, etc. Some of the known interface types are:

- FXO foreign exchange office
- FXS foreign exchange station
- DPO dial pulse originate
- DPT dial pulse terminate
- E and M signaling
- KS Kewlstart
- Loop start
- Ground start

== See also ==
- European Telecommunications Standards Institute
