= DMS-100 =

Nortel telecom switch

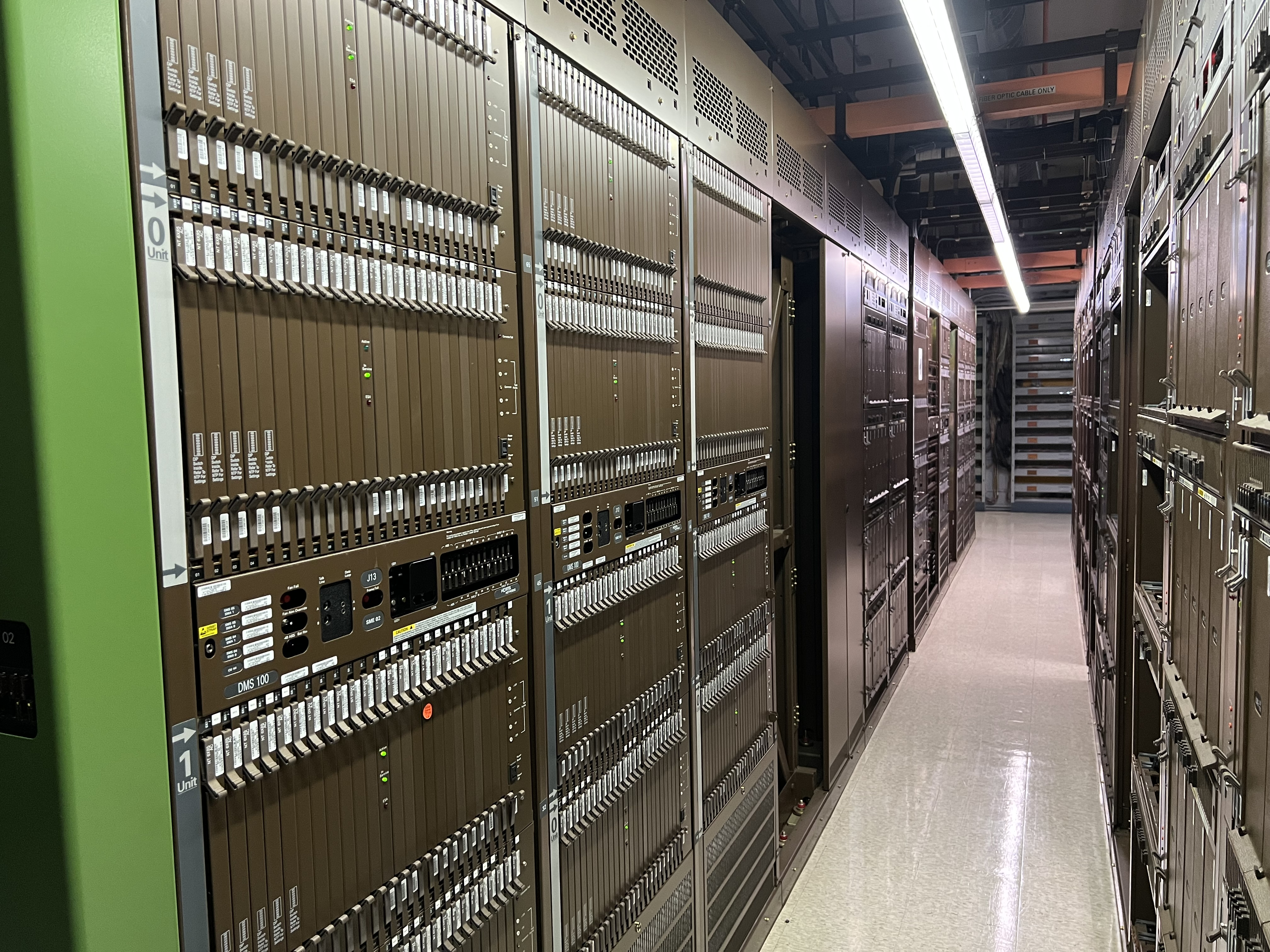
Typical Northern Telecom DMS-100 Telephone Central Office Installation

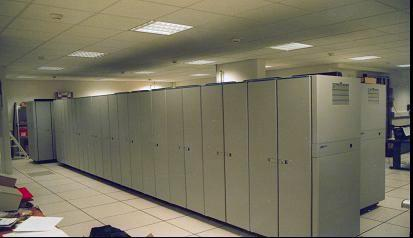
A DMS-100, in a central office located in France

The DMS-100 is a member of the Digital Multiplex System (DMS) product line of telephone exchange switches manufactured by Northern Telecom. Designed during the 1970s and released in 1979, it can serve up to 100,000 telephone lines.

The purpose of the DMS-100 Switch is to provide local telephone service and connections to the PSTN. It is designed to deliver services over subscribers' telephone lines and trunks. It provides plain old telephone service (POTS), mobility management for cellular phone systems, sophisticated business services such as automatic call distribution (ACD), Integrated Services Digital Network (ISDN), and Meridian Digital Centrex (MDC), formerly called Integrated Business Network (IBN). It also provides Intelligent Network functions (AIN, CS1-R, ETSI INAP). It is used in many countries throughout the world.

There are also DMS-200 and DMS-250 variants for tandem switches. Much of the hardware used in the DMS-100, with the possible exception of the line cards, is used in other members of the DMS family, including the DMS-200 toll switch.

== Hardware ==
All power distribution is at -48 VDC (nominal), from which DC to DC converters on every shelf provide other necessary voltages.

=== Central Control Complex (CCC) ===
The Central Control Complex comprises the Central Processing Unit (CPU), Program Store (PS), Data Store (DS) and the Central Message Controller (CMC).

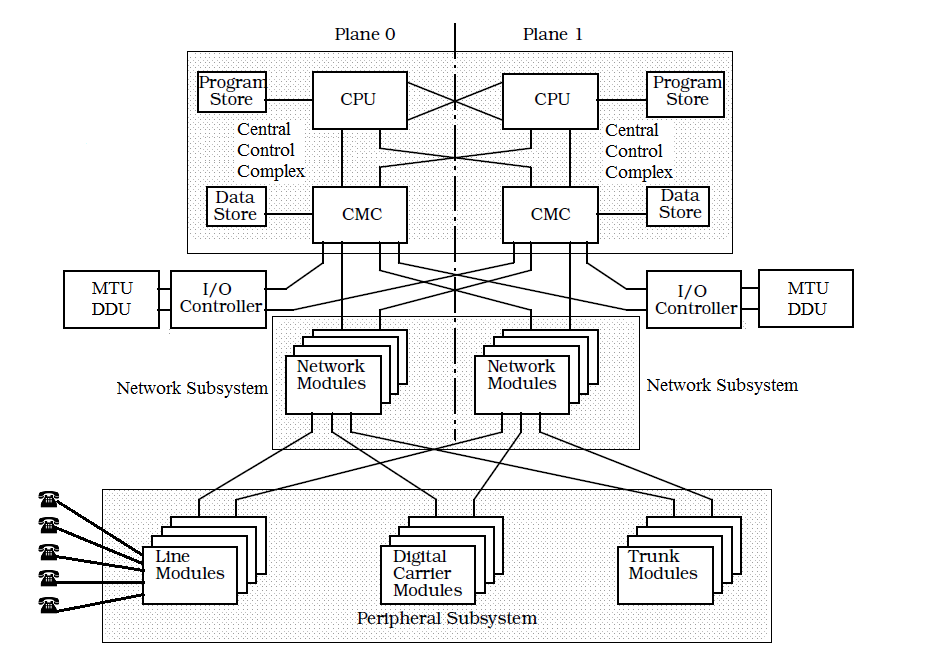
Block Diagram of the DMS-100 Telephone Switch

The CPU contains two identical 16-bit processors running in hot standby mode. The original CPU core was referred to as the NT40 CPU and was implemented in approximately 250 discrete logic devices across several circuit boards running at 36 MHz. The NT40 core consisted mainly of the NT1X44 stack card, which provides some register and stack functions of the processor, the NT1X45 which contained the arithmetic and logic functions, the NT1X46 which provides more registers and the load-route read-only memory (ROM) and the NT1X47 timing and control card which provides the micro-cycle source and microstore decoding functions of the processor. The NT1X47 card also contained the 2-digit hexadecimal display to indicate test result codes and the condition of the core. The NT1X48 processor maintenance card contained a thumbwheel on the faceplate to enable various diagnostic tests of the CPU. A later modification of these same five circuit boards with faster pin-compatible discrete logic devices enabled the CPU to operate at 40 MHz allowing central offices to improve call throughput capacity by 10 percent. When the CPU is configured in dual hot standby mode, a mate exchange bus (MEB) between the two CPUs enables the state of one CPU to be continuously compared to that of the other CPU on a cycle by cycle basis. Any discrepancy between the two CPUs results in maintenance circuitry determining which CPU is at fault and activity to change to the same CPU.

A Program Store is dedicated to each CPU and is a memory for the program instructions required by that CPU for processing calls, maintenance and for administrative tasks. The PS associated with the other CPU contains identical program instructions.

A Data Store is dedicated with each CPU and contains dynamic information on a per-call basis, as well as customer data and office-specific settings. The other CPU is also associated with its own DS containing duplicate data.

The Central Message Controller controls the flow of messages between the other units of the CCC and prioritizes them for the Network Message Controller (NMC) in the various Network Modules (NM), or the Input/Output Controller (IOC). Both CPUs have access to either CMC which share the message load to the Line Modules or peripherals.

The original NT40 based CCC was replaced by the compatible DMS SuperNode in 1987.

=== DMS SuperNode ===
The DMS SuperNode Computing Module was first based on the Motorola 68020 Central Processing Unit (CPU) and then upgraded to the Motorola 68030. In the early 1990s it was further upgraded to use the Motorola 88100 and 88110 Reduced Instruction Set Computing (RISC) CPUs. This RISC version of the SuperNode Computing Module was known as the BRISC (BNR Reduced Instruction Set Computing) CPU. With the BRISC CPU the DMS SuperNode had a processing capacity of 1,500,000 call attempts per hour.

DMS SuperNode featured increased processing capacity across a distributed architecture allowing for the development of new features and services. Each of the elements of the DMS SuperNode uses a common SuperNode CPU hardware design differing only in the software used to control them. The SuperNode consists of two main elements: DMS Core and DMS Bus.

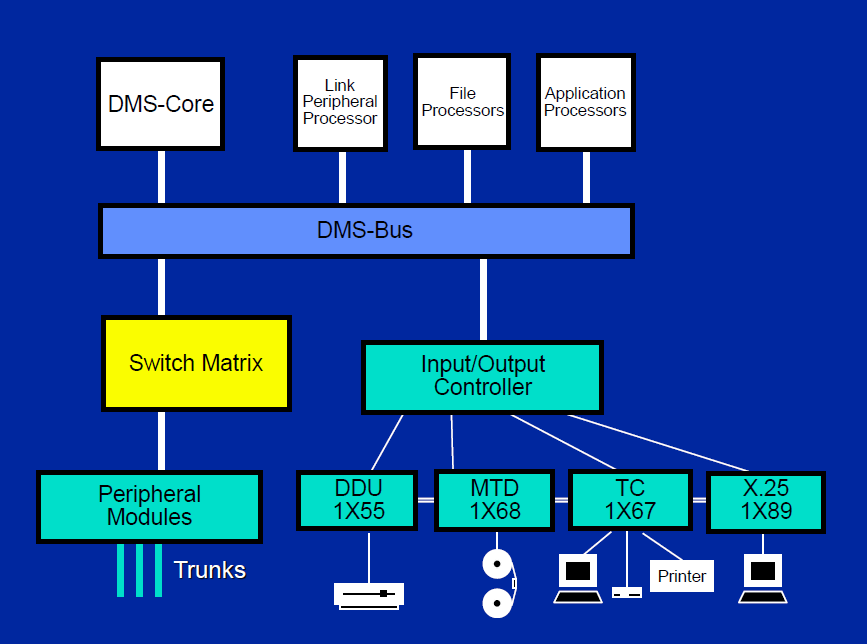
Northern Telecom DMS-100 SuperNode Architecture Block Diagram

DMS Core provides the main computing facility and is made up of the Compute Module, System Load Module and a Message Controller. The Compute Module contains redundant SuperNode CPUs to handle call processing and maintenance functions and, like the NT40 core, can operate in a synchronized mode with its mate. The System Load Module contains all the necessary software for every element of the DMS switch and also provides file system and data storage functions on magnetic tape and hard disk. The Message Controller provides communications links between the DMS Core and the DMS Bus.

DMS Bus is used to interconnect the DMS Core, the switching network and the Input/Output controller (IOC) and manage message flows between these units and consists of redundant Message Switches. The Message Switches of the DMS Bus operate in a load-sharing mode and one of them provides the main clock source for the DMS-100 system while the others are synchronized to it. Messages between all SuperNode units are carried by optical DS512 links.

The operating system used by both generations of the DMS-100 switch was called Support Operating System (SOS) and was written in a high level language called PROTEL which stood for PRocedure Oriented Type Enforcing Language developed at Bell Northern Research (BNR).

Hardware and maintenance are administered locally through cathode-ray terminals, through a multilevel menu system called MAPCI. There are various methods used to access the DMS remotely as well, including modem and telnet. Backups and other hard drive work are administered through a DISKUT command line program.

=== Line Module ===
Analog lines are terminated on individual line cards, each with its own codec, in pull-out Line Drawers in frames. The original design of such frames was called the Line Module (LM) with 32 lines per drawer. LMs were not able to send caller-id information (CLASS services) and became rare late in the century, having been supplemented or replaced by the newer Line Concentrating Module (LCM). Duplicated ringing generators serve each LM or pair of LCM. For DC testing, each line card has a relay to connect it to a test bus.

=== Line Concentrating Module ===
LCM have smaller line cards, serving 64 lines per physical drawer (two logical drawers) of the same size as in the LM. An LCM requires only half the space as an LM for the same number of lines. The majority of line cards are NT6X17, with three relays for loop start lines. Others include NT6X18 which have four or more relays and a slide switch for ground start lines (a newer version of the NT6X18 has eliminated the ground switch). The NT6X18 also has the ability to provide current reversal required for some coin phones and business systems. The NT6X17B and the NT6X18B is known as the world line card and is software configurable to more than 15 million functional settings to meet almost any signalling and transmission requirement in any market.

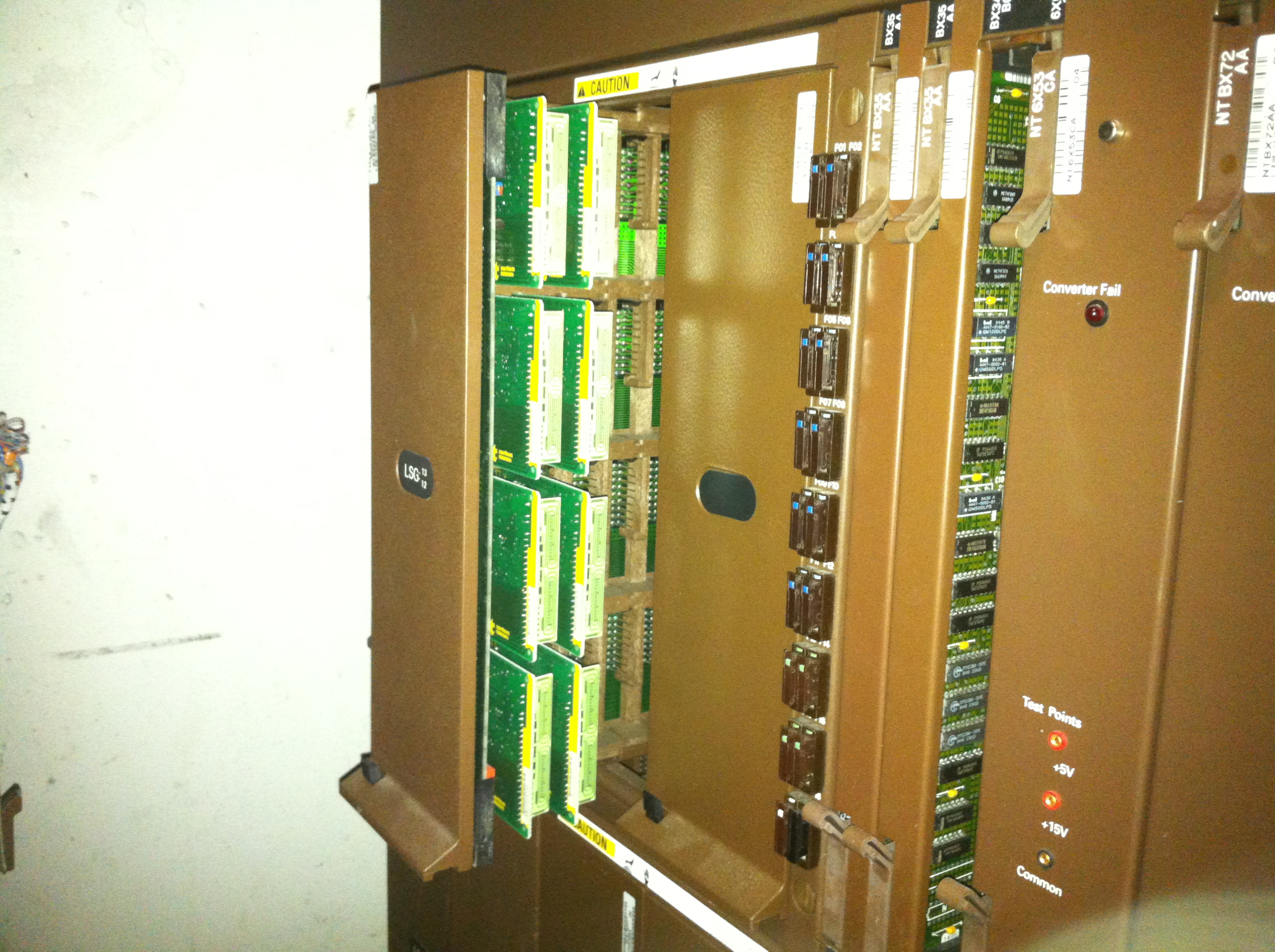
Northern Telecom DMS-100 Line Card Drawer showing line cards.

NT6X19 line cards allow the use of older style, neon message-waiting lamps, this feature also requires an additional card per drawer that supplies the voltage. Type NT6X21 cards serve P-sets (Meridian Business Sets), a special analogue telephone with a proprietary Nortel data link operating at 8 kHz to provide advanced call handling services. For example, a telephone number may appear on multiple P-sets even though each such telephone has only one pair of wires, thus providing a simpler replacement for key telephone systems. An LCME, for ISDN service, which uses NTBX27 cards serve Basic Rate ISDN lines. When provided with ring generators, an LCME can also support other linecard types. LCMs are served by a Line Group Controller (LGC) and communicate over DS-30 connections to NT6X48AA interface cards on the LGC. The number of LCMs per LGC depends on traffic: 3-4 LCM per LGC but as few as two where traffic is heavy.

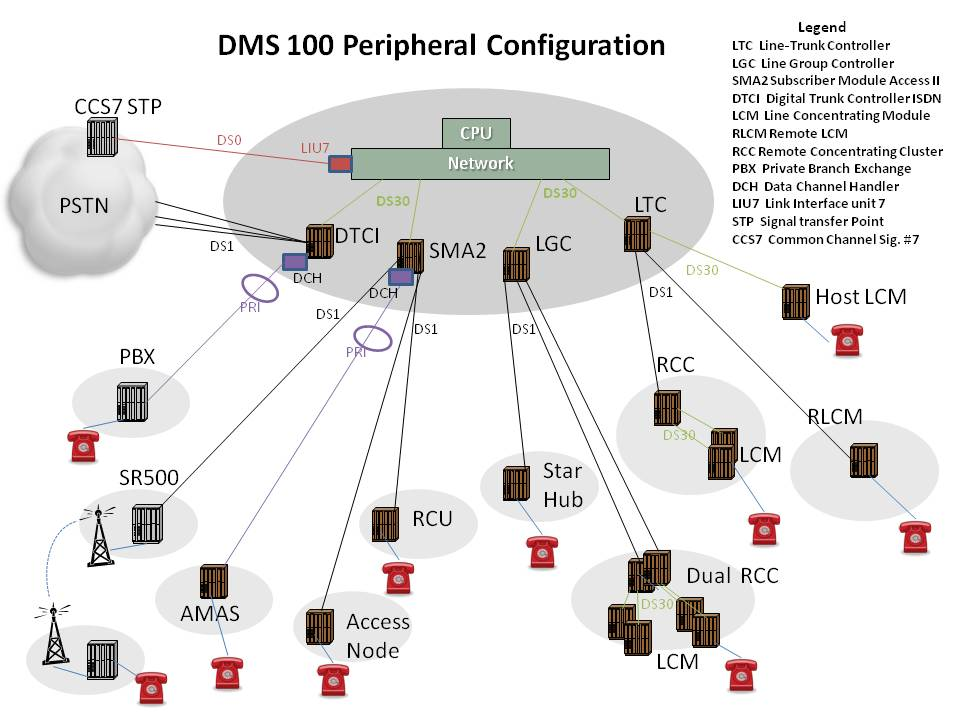
DMS-100 Peripheral Configuration

=== Remote Cluster Controller ===
Remote offices, anywhere from a kilometre to 100 km from the host, can be served by a Remote Line control Module (RLCM), Remote Switching Center (RSC); a later vintage is known as RCC2. They use T1 links to the host LGC. RCCs/RCC2s work like LTCs in controlling LCMs. Large remotes may have 2+ RCC/RCCs and they can be equipped with links between the RCCs - Interlinks; so calls within the remote do not tie up host links. The RCCs/RCC2s are usually equipped so they will provide calling within the remote office if the host links fail; this feature is called ESA; Emergency Stand Alone.

=== Remote Units ===
Another type of remote office is known as Remote Carrier Urban (RCU). Such units typically reside on the side of a road in a large box, approx 3 meters across, almost 2 meters high and almost a meter through. In the 1980s many telcos installed an early version of these instead of pulling more cable into a remote area. They were much cheaper and could provide up to approx 500 lines. Back then they needed two 'boxes' to work- a host box called a Central Terminal (CT) that had the dial tone lines wired into it and a remote box called a Remote terminal (RT) where the dial tone 'came out'. They used 2-6 T1 links on copper - i.e. LD-1 or fiber. As telcos modernized, these remote boxes were re-configured to work directly from a SMU peripheral at the host DMS. Typically each SMU can handle 3-6 RCUs.

=== Trunk Modules ===
Transmitters, receivers and other service circuits are in Trunk Module (TM) and Miscellaneous Trunk Module (MTM) shelves. Trunks are on DTC (Digital Trunk Controller) or DTCI (Digital Trunk Controller ISDN) or PDTC (PCM30 Digital Trunk Controller) shelves, usually two T-1 lines per card, ten cards per DTC for a total of 480 DS-0 voice channels. At the turn of the century many original NT6X50AA cards were still in service that cannot perform T-carrier extended superframe signaling, this can be performed with a plug-in replacement NT6X50AB card, used for services such as PBX ISDN T1s. Trunks can also be provisioned on SPM (Synchronous Peripheral Module) capable of handling 2016 DS0s, nearly 4.2x more than the DTC.

=== Line Controllers ===
Internal connections to the time switch (network) are on 2.56 Mbit/s (DS-30) Speech Links, each carrying thirty channels plus synchronization and data channels, on four wires plus a ground wire. Connections to the network are handled by the NT6X40AA DS-30 interface card on an LGC or LTC and these link may also be DS-512 optical interfaces. Using the NT6X44AA time switch card, LGCs and LTCs internally map channels on the NT6X48AA DS-30 & NT6X50AA/AB DS1 interface links to available channels on NT6X40AA DS-30 or NT6X40FA DS-512 interfaces out to the network. European PDTCs were complemented by the DTCOI2 and DTCO2. The DTCOI2 was designed to run PRI and DPNSS services as per existing PDTCOI and MSB7 peripherals. The DTCO2 was designed to carry CAS and SS7 as per existing PDTCO peripheral.

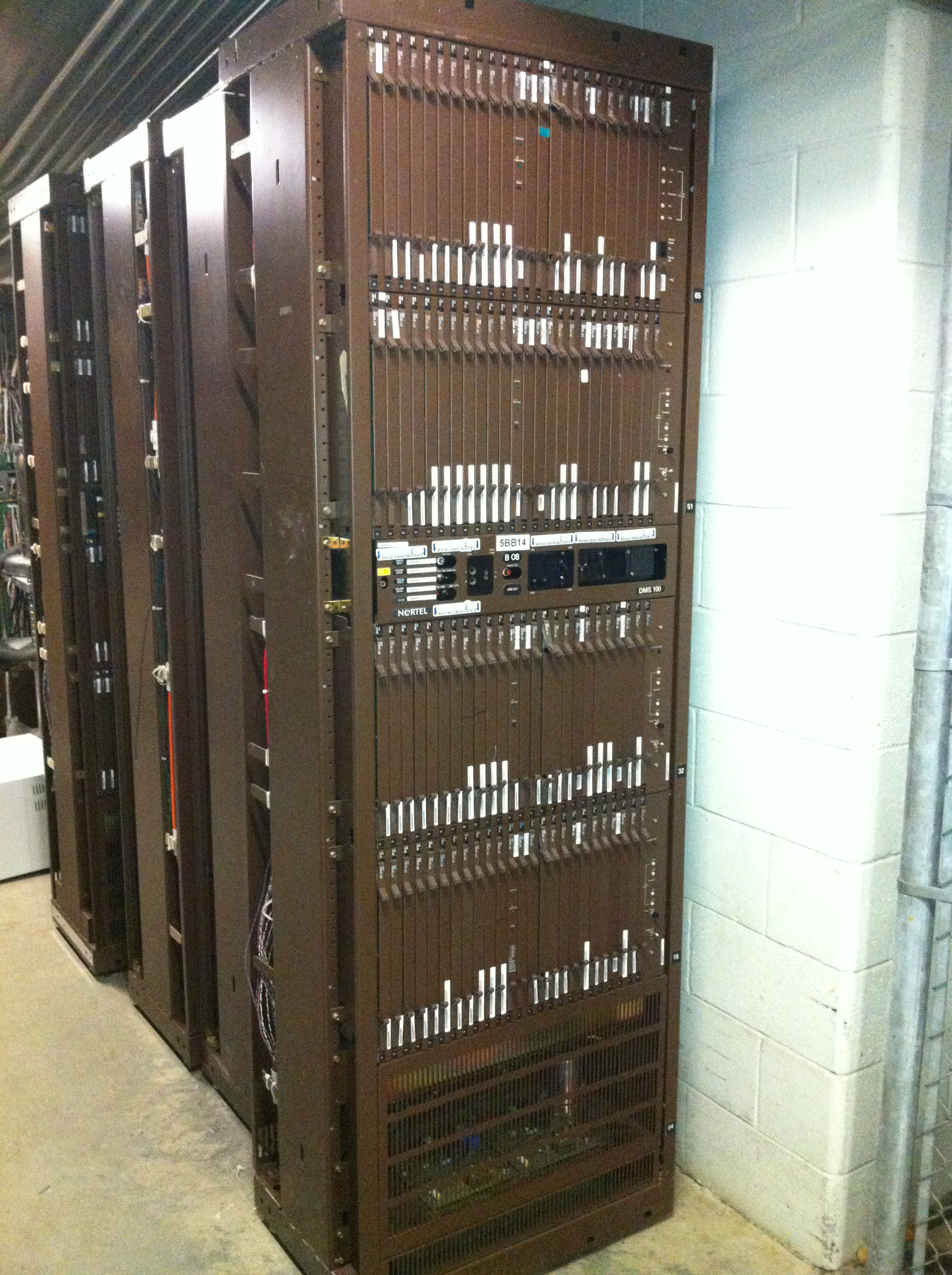
Northern Telecom DMS-100 Digital Trunk Controller (DTC)

Time Division switching is performed in E-Net, similar to the Communication Module of 5ESS switch or the Switching Network of EWSD or the Group Switch of AXE telephone exchange.

== Successors ==
There are also DMS-200 and DMS-250 variants for tandem switches.

In 2006 Nortel introduced the Communication Server 1500 (CS 1500) Softswitch based on VOIP to modernize the DMS-based telephone switches. A CS 1500 softswitch system can replace all the DMS component modules except for the LCMs, reducing the footprint of a DMS-100 to one 19" rack and allowing operators to reduce cooling and power requirements significantly.

A successor to the DMS-100 is the Communication Server 2000 (CS2K), which shares many components and software with the DMS. The significant difference is the addition of VOIP technology into the CS2K.

In 2010, Genband purchased Nortel Networks' Carrier VoIP and Application Solutions (CVAS) business for $182.5 million. Nortel is now defunct.

== See also ==
- List of telephone switches
