= Ground start =

In telephony, ground start is a method of signaling from a terminal of a subscriber local loop to a telephone exchange, where one side of a cable pair is temporarily grounded to request dial tone. Most middle 20th-century American payphones used coin-first ground start lines, with the starting ground connection provided by the coin itself, bridging a set of contacts as it passed through the coin chute.

== Ground start trunk ==
Telephone companies typically provide two types of dial-tone switched circuits – ground start and loop start. Private branch exchanges (PBX) work best on ground start trunks because those trunks can give them an on-hook signal allowing for timely clearing.

Normal single-line telephones and key systems typically work on loop-start lines. On loop-start lines the PBX and central office may inadvertently seize the line simultaneously, a condition called glare, resulting in call collision since neither gets the expected response and no call can be initiated.

In an idle circuit, the central office supplies –48V (nominally) on the ring conductor with respect to the tip side. A ground-start PBX initiates an outgoing trunk seizure on an idle circuit by connecting of the ring lead to ground (maximum local resistance of 550 ohms). The central office senses this condition and grounds the tip lead. When the PBX senses this, it goes off-hook, then removes the ground on ring. The central office sends dial tone and the rest of the call proceeds normally.

In ground-start signaling, the central office initiates a call by grounding tip and putting the ringing signal on the line. To avoid glare, before the PBX originates an outgoing call, it must first verify that the CO has not already applied ground to tip. The PBX has 100ms to sense this condition.

At the end of either an incoming or outgoing call, the PBX initiates disconnect by going on-hook, or the central office initiates disconnect by opening tip. When the other end detects the loss of loop current, it also goes on-hook and the call clears normally.

A PBX user must be careful to order the correct type of trunk line from the local phone company and correctly install the telephone system at the PBX end – so that they match. Line equipment in most 20th-century central-office switches had to be specially rewired to create a ground-start line. Crossbar switches did it with a paper sleeve on the vertical off-normal contact, 5ESS switches by translation, and DMS-100s by a slide switch on the line card, all according to what the customer ordered.

== See also ==
- Foreign exchange office
- Foreign exchange station
- BORSHT
