= Line card =

Modular circuit component

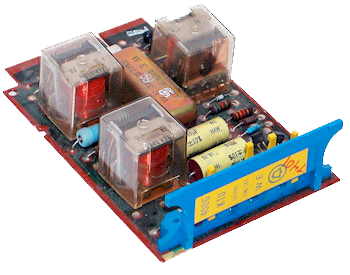
A Western Electric 400G line card for 1A2 key systems

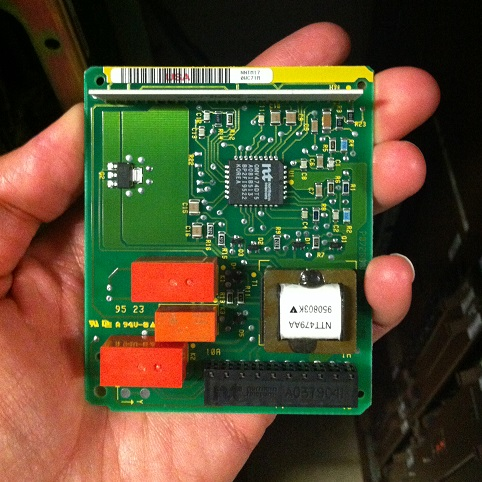
Northern Telecom World Line Card NT6X17BA, circa 1995

A line card or digital line card is a modular electronic circuit designed to fit on a separate printed circuit board (PCB) and interface with a telecommunications access network.

A line card typically interfaces with a twisted pair cable of a plain old telephone service (POTS) local loop to the public switched telephone network (PSTN). Telephone line cards perform multiple tasks, such as analog-to-digital and digital-to-analog conversion of voice, off-hook detection, ring supervision, line integrity tests, and other BORSCHT functions. In some telephone exchange designs, the line cards generate ringing current and decode DTMF signals. The line card in a subscriber loop carrier is called a subscriber line interface card (SLIC).

A line card can terminate a line supporting voice POTS service, ISDN service, DSL service, or proprietary ones. Some line cards are capable of terminating more than one type of service.

Since an access network element is usually intended to interface many users (typically a few thousand), some exchanges have multiple line terminations per card. Likewise, one network element can have many line cards.

== See also ==
- 5ESS switch
- DMS-100
