= Nortel business phones =

Nortel (previously Northern Telecom) manufactured telephones for business users from the 1980s to 2001, beginning with the Meridian series.

== Current phones ==
Nortel no longer exists. There are no phones being manufactured for, or by, Nortel. Since 2001, phones with the Nortel brand are made by Aastra Technologies Limited of Concord, Ontario.

== Previous phones ==
Nortel's previous phones include:

- Nortel DisplayPhone - early concept business phone
- Nortel SL-1 Digital Office Phone - early concept business phone
- Nortel Venture
- Nortel Maestro
- Nortel Vista 100
- Nortel Vista 200
- Nortel Meridian 9009
- Nortel Vista 350
- Nortel Vista 390
- Nortel Vista 2000
- Nortel Nomad 6000
- Nortel Nomad 6500
- Nortel Meridian M2616
- Nortel Meridian 9216
- Nortel Meridian 9316
- Nortel Meridian 8417
- Nortel Meridian Aastra 9417 CW
- Nortel Meridian 9516
- rotary outdoor telephone - for call boxes
- Nortel Meridian M3000 Touchphone - world's first production touchphone - a telephone with all indicators and functions managed by a touchscreen.

== Switching to VoIP ==
Due to proprietary digital signalling, VoIP ATA cannot be used for VoIP Enable this Phone. Portico TVA allows these phones to seamlessly integrate with softswitches .

== See also ==
- Nortel payphones
- Northern Telecom home phones
- Portico TVA
