= EWSD =

German telephone exchange system

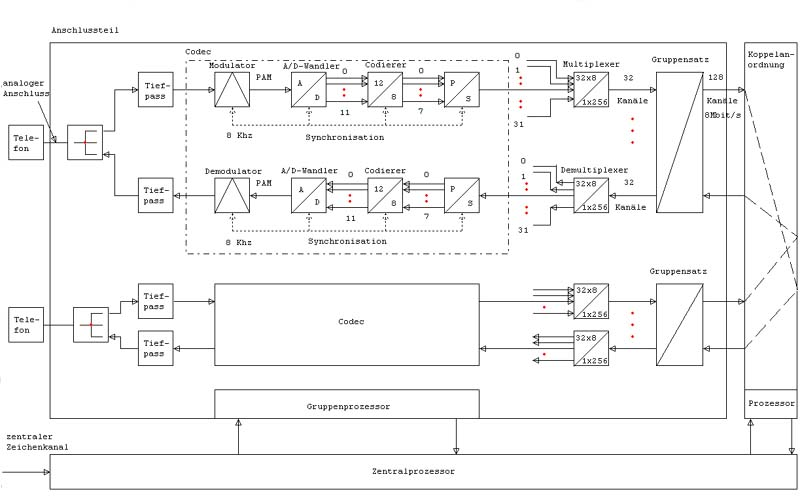
Block diagram of the EWSD digital switching system

The Elektronisches Wählsystem Digital (EWSD), translated to Electronic Digital Switching System in English, is a widely installed German telephone exchange system, originally introduced in 1975 by Siemens AG, but discontinued in 2017.

EWSD can operate as a local end-office switch, a tandem switch, or in a combined configuration for landline or mobile telephone service. Siemens claims that EWSD switches perform switching for over 160 million subscriber lines in more than one hundred countries.

== History ==
EWSD was introduced in 1975 as a successor of the EWSA (Elektronisches Wählsystem Analog), which was using analogue technology.

DeTeWe bought its first EWSD under license in 1985 for remote switching. Bosch built its first EWSD as a local exchange in 1986. Deutsche Telekom, formerly Deutsche Bundespost, the largest German telephone company, uses EWSD and System 12 (Alcatel), the former more than the latter.

In 2007, Siemens AG and Nokia Corporation jointly formed a new company called Nokia Siemens Networks, and transferred responsibility of further development and shipments of the EWSD system to the new company. In 2013, after Nokia completed the acquisition of the Siemens stake in the company, Nokia Siemens Networks was rebranded to Nokia Solutions and Networks, and finally as Nokia Networks in 2014.

== Hardware ==
The major six subsystems of EWSD are the Coordination Processor (CP), the Common Channel Network Control (CCNC), the Line Trunk Group (LTG), the Digital Line Unit (DLU), the Switching Network (SN), and the ISDN Primary Access Unit (PH).

All system units are redundant so that the inactive side of each component can take over immediately in case of an error.

DLU handles analog and ISDN lines and includes codecs for analog lines, one of the BORSCHT functions for subscriber lines. Digital signals are assigned a time slot. DLU concentrates traffic onto an LTG-B unit, as well as Primary Rate ISDN and V5.2 connections. Supervision and address signalling (dial pulse, DTMF) are also integrated in the DLU. For PCM30 (E-1) connections to other exchanges, LTG-C Units are used, which also handle signalling including SS7, MFC R2 signalling, IKZ (dial pulse), and E&M.

The Switching Network consists of four space division stages of 16x16 switches, and a time division section with 16 stages of 4x4 switches. Control is provided by the Coordination Processor.

The Coordination Processors exists in several types:

- CP103 with max 22,000 BHCA (Busy Hour Call Attempts)
- CP112 with max 60,000 BHCA
- CP113D with max one million BHCA
- CP113C with max six million BHCA
- CP113E with max ten million BHCA

== Software ==
The software of EWSD is called the Automatic Program System (APS). The APS is stored on a disk drive and includes the operating system, developed by Siemens in cooperation with Bosch. It is predominantly written in the CHILL language. Application software is switch-specific and manages functionality including traffic management, path search, and call charging. Support software serves translating programs, binding modules as well as administration of libraries for generating data. Operating and data communication software serve for co-operation of maintenance centers and switching centers.

== Technical data ==
- Number of access lines: to 250,000
- Number of feeder lines: 240,000
- Traffic connection: 25,200
- Call attempts in busy hour: 10 million
- Operating voltages: -48V -60V -90V
- Rate zones: 127, for each zone of 6 tariffs
- Tariff change-over at 15-minute intervals
- Space requirement with 10,000 access lines: 35 square meters
