= Foreign exchange service =

Foreign exchange service may refer to:

- Foreign exchange service (finance)
- Foreign exchange service (telecommunications)
- Currency Exchange
