= PLR =

PLR may refer to:

== Political parties ==
- Partito liberale-radicale svizzero, Italian name for the Free Democratic Party of Switzerland
- Partidul Liberal Reformator, Romanian title for the Liberal Reformist Party (Moldova)
- Partidul Liberal Reformator, Romanian title for the Liberal Reformist Party (Romania)
- Partido Liberal Radical or Radical Liberal Party (Paraguay)
- PLR.Les Libéraux-Radicaux and PLR.I Liberali, French and Italian names respectively for FDP.The Liberals, a Swiss political party
- Republican Party of Chile, abbreviated as PLR
- Pour La Réunion, founded in 2012

== Codes ==
- ICAO airline designator for Northwestern Air
- IATA code for St. Clair County Airport, Pell City, Alabama, United States
- ISO 639-3 code for the Palaka language, spoken in Ivory Coast

== Other uses ==
- Parramatta Light Rail, a light rail line in Sydney, New South Wales, Australia
- Pupillary light reflex of the eye
- Private letter ruling, US taxpayer guidance
- Public Lending Right, author payments for library book loans
- Pulse link repeater, a telecommunications device
- Point of local repair of a network in MPLS local protection
- Psycho+Logical-Records, an American record label
- WPLR or 99.1 PLR, a radio station, New Haven, Connecticut, US
