= Publicly Available Telephone Services =

Publicly Available Telephone Services (PATS) means a service available to the public for originating and receiving national and international calls and access to emergency services through a telephone number or numbers in a national or international telephone numbering plan, and may, where relevant, also include one or more of the following:

- (a) operator assistance,
- (b) directory assistance facilities,
- (c) directories,
- (d) pay telephones,
- (e) service under special terms,
- (f) specific facilities for end-users with a disability or with special social needs, and
- (g) non-geographic services

== Resilience ==
A plain old telephone service has high reliability and is unlikely to be affected by local power outages. More modern systems require battery back-up to guard against local power outages. The United Kingdom telephone regulator, Ofcom, has published a guidance note for telephone service providers: "Protecting access to emergency organisations when there is a power cut at the customer’s premises".

== See also ==
- Common carrier
- Plain old telephone service
- Public switched telephone network
