= Supervision (telephony) =

Type of signaling in telephony

In telecommunication, supervision is the monitoring of a telecommunication circuit to convey to an operator, user, or a switching system, information about the operational state of the circuit. The typical operational states of trunks and lines are the idle and busy states, seizure, and disconnect. The states are indicated by various electrical signals and electrical conditions depending on the type of circuit, the type of terminating equipment, and the type of intended service.

Answer and disconnect supervision are functions of line signaling that convey circuit seizure and disconnect. Answer supervision indicates that a call has been answered. Disconnect supervision provides a signal that the call has been disconnected.

For example, the called party may indicate to the telephone exchange that the call is being disconnected by the called party by allowing loop current to flow in the line, or the called party indicates to the exchange that the call is being answered.

== Requirement ==
The primary reason for answer and disconnect supervision is for billing. The telephone company and the customer need an accurate accounting of calls. It is standard for telephone companies not to charge for unanswered or unsuccessful calls. All call detail records (CDRs) produced should indicate a call was unanswered or unsuccessful, and therefore, incur no charge from the billing system.

Some systems may not cut through the audio path until there is a positive indication that the called party answered the call—there may not be an audio connection until the answer signal is sent.

Lastly, the channel should become free to take new calls when the previous call clears. If there was no indication of the call's disconnect, thus no teardown or clearing then all channels in the system would eventually be blocked.

== Operation ==
This example shows a T1 trunk using E&M wink start signaling only. Other methods can be used, although this was the most common in 20th-century private circuits.

Wink start is used to notify the remote side or PBX that it can send the Dialed Number Identification Service (DNIS), also referred to as the Called Number. Automatic Number Identification (ANI) can also be transmitted.

For an incoming call, this occurs:

1. Calling switch goes off-hook. It sends ABCD bits = 1111.
2. The called switch sends wink. The ABCD bits transition from 0000 to 1111 for 200 ms, then back to 0000.
3. The calling switch sees the wink, and then proceeds to send the "DNIS" (called number) information. This is done when inband multifrequency/dual tone multifrequency (MF/DTMF) tones are sent.
4. The called switch goes off-hook when the call is answered. It sends ABCD bits = 1111.
5. The audio path is connected, parties can talk, and the billing system registers a call start record.

In an outgoing call the same procedure occurs, but the calling switch and called switch exchange roles.

These occur when a disconnect from the calling party happens:

1. Calling switch goes on-hook by sending ABCD bits = 0000.
2. The called switch sees the network go on-hook and the switch goes on-hook. ABCD bits = 0000.
3. The audio path is disconnected, and the billing system registers a call stop record.

For a disconnect from the called party to the calling party, these steps are reversed.

Winks start signalling can also be used on a two wire loop type circuit, where it essentially replaces dial tone. This was/is quite common on DID (Direct In Dial) trunks from a central office to a customer's PBX, where only the last 3 or 4 digits of an extension are sent. When the office seized a trunk (applied a loop), the PBX would return a short wink (current reversal) to indicate that a connection was established and it was OK to send the digits.

In the early days of DTMF use, DTMF receivers were expensive and many PBXs were equipped with the bare minimum. This meant that a seized incoming trunk may not be ready to receive DTMF immediately as it could with dial pulse. Some central office switches would make a second attempt on another trunk if a wink were not received after a set time. In this way, calls would not fail if there was an open on one of the trunks.

Some older toll equipment also required the wink when connecting to local switches such as step-by-step. This was accomplished with a small relay device wired to the rear of the incoming selector that would momentarily reverse the current, the originating switch would then pulse the digits.

== Supervision signals ==
The signal used for supervision varies depending on the type of trunk being used. These signal types include:

1. Digital E&M - Used on T1 carriers with Channel Associated Signalling trunks
2. Analog E&M - Used for analog E&M signalling trunks
3. Analog Disconnect Tone - Used in many South American countries on analog loop start trunks
4. Analog Open Switching Interval (OSI) - Used in North America on analog loop start trunks
5. Digital ISDN - Used with both PRI and BRI digital trunks

== E&M signaling ==
For channel-associated signaling (CAS) in Digital Signal 1 (T1) trunks that use E and M signaling (earth & magneto, or ear & mouth signaling), there are only two voice channel states. A channel is idle/on hook when there is no call on it or seized/off-hook/energized by an active call. There is no separate state for answered. It mimics an analog loopstart or groundstart line.

After a channel is initially seized, each device must indicate the progress of a call. The progress indicators include whether a call is answered or remains unanswered, and when a call is answered, which party disconnects first. These call progress states are important as Telephony systems need to know when the call was attempted, answered, and cleared, hence the term Answer and Disconnect Supervision.

== Calling party control ==
Calling party control (CPC), or forward disconnect, is a telecommunication signal sent from a central office to the telephone subscriber's equipment to indicate that the calling party has hung up. This indicates that answering machines should stop recording, notifies conference call bridges that a participant has left or removes an abandoned call from a hold queue or interactive voice response menu. The signal may be implemented by removal of battery on the circuit (open switching interval) or by polarity reversal of the tip and ring conductors of the telephone line. An analogue telephone line may also send tones, such as a busy signal, reorder tone, or dial tone, to indicate a call has ended.

Some digital trunks, such as SS7, use out-of-band signaling to indicate termination of a call.

== Open switching interval ==
An open switching interval (OSI), also called open loop disconnect, is a period of time for which the central office battery is removed from a telephone line. The removal of battery may be used to signal the disconnection (disconnect supervision) of the telephone circuit.

The term open switching interval originates from the time of early electronic switching systems in the Bell System, e.g. the 1ESS, that replaced electromechanical switches. In the 1ESS switching system employing ferreed crosspoint switches, battery may have temporarily been removed for a few hundred milliseconds from the tip and ring conductors during switching network reconfigurations. When used with early key telephone systems, this caused a problem of calls, held by the customer via their key telephone, being disconnected inadvertently.

In modern telephone systems, including voice over IP (VoIP) media gateways, OSI is intentionally used as a supervisory signal to communicate call disconnection. It indicates that the far end system has released the call.

== See also ==
- Disconnect tone
- Kewlstart
