= Teardown =

Teardown may refer to:

- Teardown (real estate), the process of replacing an old building with a new one
- Clearing (telecommunications), a process of circuit disconnection
- Teardown (video game), a video game by Tuxedo Labs
