= Disengagement originator =

User or execution unit that initiates a disengagement attempt

In telecommunications, a disengagement originator is the user or execution unit that initiates a disengagement attempt. The disengagement originator may be the originating user, the destination user, or the communications system. The communications system may deliberately originate the disengagement because of preemption, or inadvertently due to system malfunction.

== See also ==
- Call setup – Telecommunications process
- Clearing, also known as teardown – Telecommunications term with multiple senses
- Signaling System 7 – Set of telephony signaling protocols
