= Call collision =

In the field of telecommunications, a call collision, commonly referred to as a glare, can occur in two situations:

1. Terminal and Data Circuit-Terminating Equipment (DCE) Contention: This type of call collision arises when both a terminal and a data circuit-terminating equipment (DCE) simultaneously designate the same communication channel to initiate a call request and handle an incoming call. In such cases, the DCE prioritizes the call request and proceeds with it, resulting in the cancellation of the incoming call.
2. Trunk or Channel Seizure at Both Ends: The second scenario involves a call collision when a trunk or channel is seized simultaneously at both ends. This situation can lead to conflicts and disruptions in the communication flow.

Glare can sometimes be experienced when attempting to make an outgoing call on a private branch exchange (PBX) system but getting connected to an incoming call instead. This occurrence can also happen in residential settings if an outgoing call is initiated at the precise moment when an incoming call is about to start ringing.

To mitigate the risk of glare, Multi-line hunting techniques are employed. These techniques involve selecting circuits in the opposite preference order, ensuring that the highest numbered line, which is typically the last choice for incoming calls, becomes the first choice for outgoing calls. The following example illustrates the sequence:

incoming -->1
            2
            3
            4
            5
            6
            7
            8<-- outgoing

With PRI circuits, the channel selection sequence is specified when the circuit is provisioned. Common practice is to have the PBX use descending channel selection, and the carrier to use ascending. Glare is not common on PRI circuits because the signaling is so fast, however it is not impossible (especially if there are subtle differences in the timers at either end, and the circuit is being used at near-capacity). The users will not experience a connection to an unexpected call (as would be the case with analog circuits), because glare causes protocol errors that generally prevent any sort of successful connection. Instead, one or both of the call attempts might fail, and ideally an error would appear in the logs (this depends on the logging capabilities of the systems at either end of the circuit). Glare is quite rare on PRI circuits, and can be difficult to troubleshoot.

For old, analog PBX trunks, glare can be reduced by using ground start signaling, which offers a better answer and disconnect supervision. IE: Nortel BSP discouraged using loop start trunks for this and other reasons. Long Distance exchanges in the 1950s and 60s incorporated Glare Detectors to alleviate the problem.
