= Call setup =

Telecommunications process

In telecommunication, call setup is the process of establishing a virtual circuit across a telecommunications network. Call setup is typically accomplished using a signaling protocol.

The term call set-up time has the following meanings:

1. The overall length of time required to establish a circuit-switched call between users.
2. For data communication, the overall length of time required to establish a circuit-switched call between terminals; i.e., the time from the initiation of a call request to the beginning of the call message.

Note: Call set-up time is the summation of: (a) call request time—the time from initiation of a calling signal to the delivery to the caller of a proceed-to-select signal; (b) selection time—the time from the delivery of the proceed-to-select signal until all the selection signals have been transmitted; and (c) post selection time—the time from the end of the transmission of the selection signals until the delivery of the call-connected signal to the originating terminal.

== Success rate ==
In telecommunications, the call setup success rate (CSSR) is the fraction of the attempts to make a call that result in a connection to the dialled number (due to various reasons not all call attempts end with a connection to the dialled number). This fraction is usually measured as a percentage of all call attempts made.

In telecommunications a call attempt invokes a call setup procedure, which, if successful, results in a connected call. A call setup procedure may fail due to a number of technical reasons. Such calls are classified as failed call attempts. In many practical cases, this definition needs to be further expanded with a number of detailed specifications describing which calls exactly are counted as successfully set up and which not. This is determined to a great degree by the stage of the call setup procedure at which a call is counted as connected. In modern communications systems, such as cellular (mobile) networks, the call setup procedure maybe very complex and the point at which a call is considered successfully connected may be defined in a number of ways, thus influencing the way the call setup success rate is calculated. If a call is connected successfully but the dialled number is busy, the call is counted as successful.

Another term, used to denote call attempts that fail during the call setup procedure, is blocked calls.

The call setup success rate in conventional (so-called land-line) networks is extremely high and is significantly above 99.9%. In mobile communication systems using radio channels the call setup success rate is lower and may range for commercial networks between 90% and 98% or higher. The main reasons for unsuccessful call setups in mobile networks are lack of radio coverage (either in the downlink or the uplink), radio interference between different subscribers, imperfections in the functioning of the network (such as failed call setup redirect procedures), overload of the different elements of the network (such as cells), etc.

The call setup success rate is one of the key performance indicators (KPIs) used by the network operators to assess the performance of their networks. It is assumed to have direct influence on the customer satisfaction with the service provided by the network and its operator. The call setup success rate is usually included, together with other technical parameters of the network, in a key performance indicator known as service accessibility.

The operators of telecommunication networks aim at increasing the call setup success rate as much as practical and affordable. In mobile networks this is achieved by improving radio coverage, expanding the capacity of the network and optimising the performance of its elements, all of which may require considerable effort and significant investments on the part of the network operator.

== See also ==
- Clearing (telecommunications)
