= Managed facilities-based voice network =

A managed facilities-based voice network (MFVN) is a communications network managed, operated, and maintained by a voice service provider that delivers traditional telephone service via a loop start analog telephone interface. MFVNs are interconnected with the public switched telephone network (PSTN) or other MFVNs and provide dialtone to end users. Historically, this was provided by equipment at Bell company central offices, however today's MFVNs can include a combination of access network (last mile network of copper, coaxial cable, fiber optics, or cellular), battery-backed customer premises equipment (CPE), network switches and routers, network management systems, voice call servers, and gateways to the broader PSTN.

MFVN service providers can include cable operators and telephone companies, as well as new entrants that partner with these traditional carriers, but don't include providers that use customer-managed, non-battery-backed CPE to provide POTS service.

== Definition ==
According to NFPA 72 2010, 3.3.141, an MFVN is defined simply as:

A physical facilities-based network capable of transmitting real time signals with formats unchanged that is managed, operated, and maintained by the service provider to ensure service quality and reliability from the subscriber location to public switched telephone network (PSTN) interconnection points or other MFVN peer networks.

== History ==
The term MFVN was introduced in 2007 by various telephony user organizations and stakeholders who rely on telephone service to provide security and life safety services. The concern of these organizations and stakeholders was the reliability of new telephone technology and services. This new technology was based on packet voice technology, or the Voice over Internet Protocol, which was not well understood. These organizations and stakeholders increasingly realized that they could no longer simply assume that phone service would be reliable enough, because it was increasingly being delivered in various ways, even by traditional providers. Clear performance requirements were needed to define when a phone line was suitable for security and life safety services.

This issue was not new, as analog copper based networks had been transitioning to digital telephony technology for 25 years (via fiber buildout by telephone companies), and to IP technology methods for the last 10 years (via broadband buildout by telco, cable, and competitive local exchange carriers). What was new was that copper based analog phone service was not even an option anymore in many areas, as it was being completely replaced by digital and IP based phone service.

Starting in the early part of the 2000s, IP based voice services began being offered by non-traditional providers such as cable television service providers and Internet voice service providers. The demand for these services grew due to competitive pricing and value added services not offered by the traditional telephone providers. The use of these non-traditional telephone methods for security and life safety communications was not well understood, so use was discouraged and in some cases not allowed by local authorities. There was no distinction between voice services provided over the "best-effort" Internet and voice services provided over managed facilities. It became clear that only managed facilities based providers could assure reliability end to end. Only facilities based providers could monitor and maintain the expected quality of service (call quality, operation during power failure, wiring procedures that guaranteed pre-emption of existing calls for emergency calls, and local disaster recovery capabilities).

In 2007, the concept of the Managed Facilities-based Voice Network was introduced by non-traditional telephone providers as a way to think about the PSTN as a collection of managed networks, rather than as a single, monolithic entity.

By 2009, the large incumbent carriers were starting to publicly talk about their desire to move away from traditional analog phone lines. At a September investor conference, Verizon Communications CEO Ivan Seidenberg said that Verizon, "was simply no longer concerned with telephones that are connected with wires." Three months later, AT&T sent a letter to the FCC in which they announced plain old telephone service as a "relic of a by-gone era."

Due to this national trend, the NFPA felt the need to act quickly in 2009, publishing Tentative Interim Amendment (TIA) 10-3 for incorporation into the NFPA 72 (National Fire Alarm and Signaling Code) 2010 edition. The new language introduced by TIA 10-3, and incorporated into the final NFPA 72 2010 edition, became the national standard in the United States for determining whether a given phone line is an acceptable method for fire alarm signaling transmission from a protected premises to a supervising central monitoring station.

With this clarification at the national level, local authorities, such as fire inspectors and other Authorities Having Jurisdiction (AHJs), are provided with clear, uniform guidance from the NFPA that operators attesting themselves as providing phone service as an MFVN service provider are an acceptable replacement for the traditional "common carriers".

Most, if not all, states recognize and accept the use of MFVN. For example, in Florida it was adopted by statute, whereby all qualified MFVNs are allowed for fire alarm monitoring.

== Explanatory Material ==
Within NFPA 72, there is a section entitled Annex A, Explanatory Material. Within this appendix, NFPA 72 provides further detail of what an MFVN service should entail:

Managed facilities-based voice network service is functionally equivalent to traditional PSTN-based services provided by authorized common carriers (public utility telephone companies) with respect to dialing, dial plan, call completion, carriage of signals and protocols, and loop voltage treatment and provides all of the following features:

(1) A loop start telephone circuit service interface.

(2) Pathway reliability that is assured by proactive management, operation, and maintenance by the MFVN provider.

(3) 8 hours of standby power supply capacity for MFVN communications equipment either located at the protected premises or field deployed. Industry standards followed by the authorized common carriers (public utility telephone companies), and the other communications service providers that operate MFVNs, specifically engineer the selection of the size of the batteries, or other permanently located standby power source, in order to provide 8 hours of standby power with a reasonable degree of accuracy. Of course, over time, abnormal ambient conditions and battery aging can always have a potentially adverse effect on battery capacity. The MFVN field-deployed equipment typically monitors the condition of the standby battery and signals potential battery failure to permit the communications service provider to take appropriate action.

(4) 24 hours of standby power supply capacity for MFVN communications equipment located at the communication service provider's central office.

(5) Installation of network equipment at the protected premises with safeguards to prevent unauthorized access to the equipment and its connections.
