= Emergency Stand Alone =

Emergency Stand Alone (ESA) is a term used by the vendors of telephone equipment such as Nortel DMS-100, Lucent 5ESS or GTD-5.

Typically, small towns or communities have telephone services provided from a "remote switching unit" which is controlled by the more powerful host switching complex. ESA occurs when the host/remote links are severed, thus leaving the region in "community isolation". While in the ESA mode, the town/community is limited to only receiving or placing calls within that community/town.

Larger towns/regions may have several remote switching units which required "backdoor trunking" to connect all remote units during ESA within the same town/community. Special translations can be implemented to allow 911 to be redirected to a local number such as the local police station or fire hall that resides within that same community/town.
