= Hook flash =

Telephone signal

On analog telephone lines with special services, a flash or register-recall signal is a brief disconnection of the local loop circuit, used to control functions on the public telephone exchange, PBX or VoIP ATA.

The term "register-recall" in Europe refers to sending a discrete signal to alert the "register" – the logical system controlling a telephone exchange, that it should accept commands from the end user in the middle of a call. The register was normally disconnected from the circuit once a call was set up.

In contemporary telephone systems, the functions of the register are carried out by software and computer hardware, but in previous generations of electromechanical exchanges, using technology such as crossbar or reed relay, the register was often a system of analog electronics or even relay logic.

The terms flash and hook flash are commonly used in North America, while in Europe a similar signal is referred to as a register-recall or, more commonly, recall or simply the "R" button. These signals perform similar functions but are not necessarily identical.

The flash signal is obtained by momentarily depressing the hook switch, by pressing a dedicated button, or by any other means such as software control. In systems influenced by American standards, the switching system will accept quite a long disconnection time, with a duration between 300 ms and 1000 ms, typical of a manual hook flash. In most systems based on European standards, a precisely defined loop disconnect pulse is used, typically 100 ms or 120 ms in duration, similar to a single pulse on a pulse dialing telephone. These systems are similar but may be mutually incompatible.

The longer flash time programmed on a North American telephone, or a manual hook flash, may cause a European switch to clear the line, while a short pulse from a European phone may be ignored by a North American switching system. Many modern telephones, sold across multiple markets, allow the end user to define the flash time in software or with a switch setting. For example, some devices allow this to be set between 90 ms and 1000 ms. This means that the phone can be configured to be used with various public PSTN networks, PABX and business systems, or devices like analog telephone adaptors (ATAs) used for connecting simple analog telephones to Voice over IP (VoIP) services.

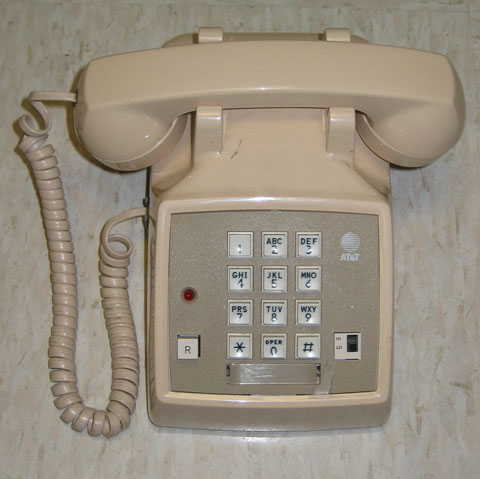
Typical standard phone used with Centrex, with recall button and the red message waiting lamp to the left of the keypad

Manual hook flash to enable call switching on a German desk phone (FeTAp 711 model)

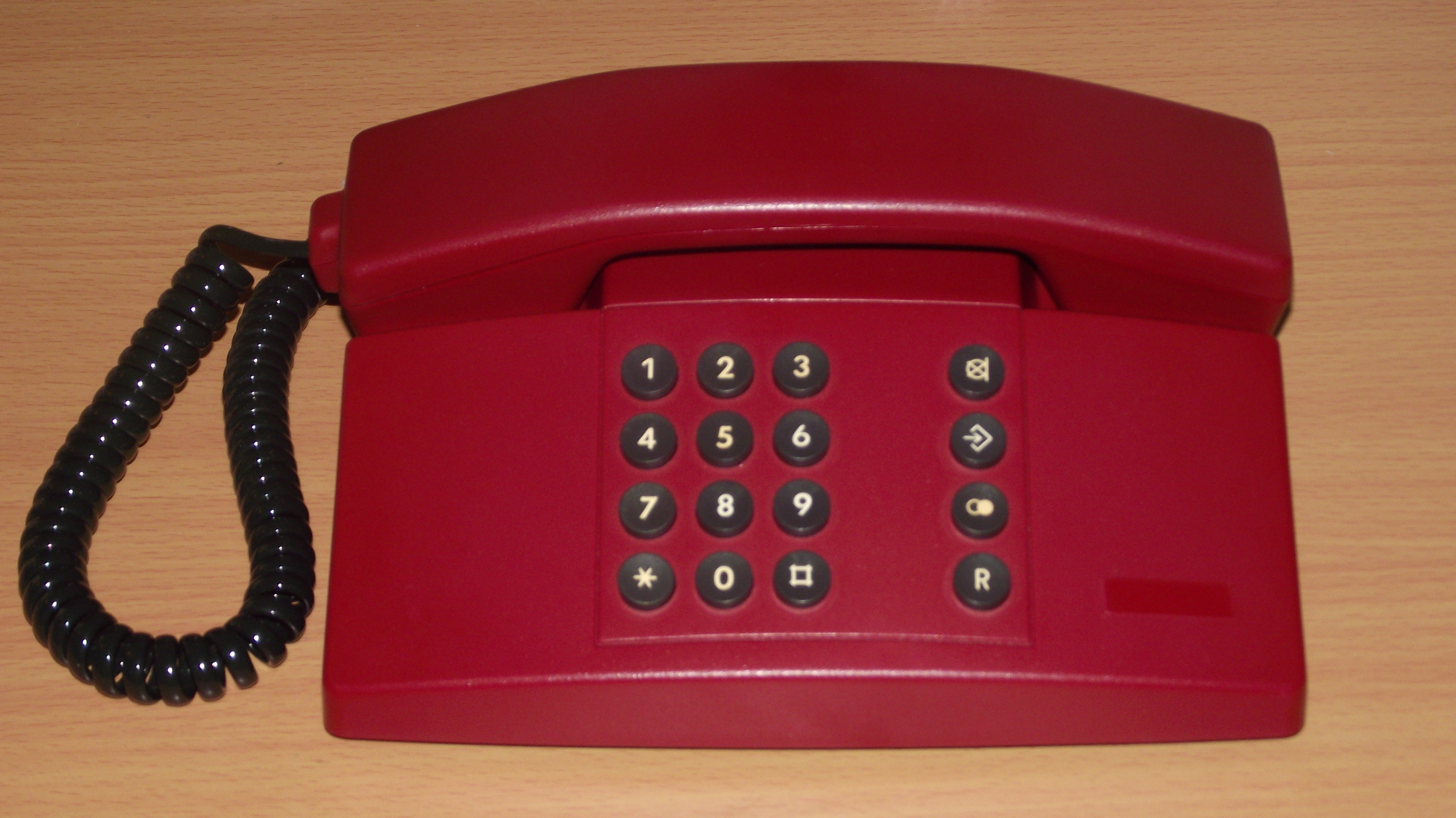
European phone with R button

A common use of a hook flash for special action is to switch to another incoming call with call waiting service.

It is also commonly used for placing calls on hold, initiating inquiries, setting conference calls up, and transferring calls to other extensions in a PABX

Another use is to indicate a request for voice conferencing, for example, a user may use a procedure like the following to initiate three-way calling. This is the typical procedure in most North American networks and some office systems:

1. Pick up phone handset (causing the line to be off-hook).
2. Hear a dial tone.
3. Dial the first number and greet the first party.
4. Press the hook flash button (or quickly tap the on-hook sensor on the phone).
5. Hear a stutter dial tone (a series of beeps followed by another dial tone).
6. Dial the second number and greet the second party.
7. Press the hook flash button again.

The second "flash" signals the central-office switch to link the two active conversations, so that all three parties are connected to the same logical telephone line.

In European networks an “R” button is used in combination with touch tone digits to select various call handling functions. For example:

Call Waiting:

- R1 – Answers incoming call & terminates current call.
- R2 – Answers current call & allows the user to toggle between calls.
- R3 – Establishes a three-party conference.
- R0 – Rejects incoming call and temporarily disables call waiting.

Pressing the R button during a call usually places the call on hold and returns a dial tone. A second number can then be dialed. Calls can then be toggled between with R2 or conferenced together with R3.

On Centrex lines, PBX systems and VoIP ATAs a hook flash or the R-button is also used to perform call transfer (blind or with an enquiry) on analog extensions.

During a call the hook is flashed (manually or Flash or R is pressed) placing the current call on hold and returning a dial tone. A new number is then dialed and when the phone is hung up, the call is transferred. In European systems, pressing R before hanging up, typically retrieves the call on hold and cancels the process without transferring the call.

Some PBX systems, notably in Europe, use an Earth Recall. This signal connects one leg of the telephone circuit to the ground momentarily to signal the exchange. It's usually not used in public two-wire networks, but was common in analog office systems. Many European telephones have a switch to configure the R button to perform this function instead of a timed break recall.

A related service was often found on payphones in Europe and some other parts of the world where a Follow on Call (FC) button was often provided. While similar in some ways to a hook flash, this was quite different. Rather than simply flashing the hook, the phone would go completely on-hook (hanging up) several seconds and would present a new dial tone, while retaining a credit balance on the phone (coins or card). This allowed the user to make a second call without needing to collect unused coins or re-insert their card on phones that used prepaid cards. It is not hook flash signaling, but rather just hanging up the line.

== History ==
The switchhook is the device that senses whether the handset or receiver is in its cradle. The term flash originated from the cord circuit of the early telephone switchboard that telephone company operators used to connect calls. The calling party and called party each had an indicator light on the cord circuit. When the subscriber cycled the telephone on-hook/off-hook, the light would flash. Actors in old movies often demonstrate this method, seeking the operator's attention. The user performs a tap-tap-tap. When an operator comes on the line, the actor says, "Hello? Operator? We've been cut off." Then the operator attempts to reestablish the connection. The flashing light of this early equipment is the origin of the phrase flashing the switchhook.

Centrex telephones added a hook-flash button in the 1960s after some users attempted the attendant-recall function incorrectly and disconnected their calls inadvertently.
