= Nortel payphones =

Series of payphone models

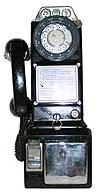
N233H pay phone

Northern Telecom (from 1998 known as Nortel) manufactured several different payphone models. They were most commonly used in Canada and the United States. Nortel has manufactured several types in Canada.

== Early payphones ==
- N213H-3
- N233H

== Series 200/ QSD-3A ==
Northern Electric, Nortel's previous name made chrome payphones in the 1950s. The same phone was also made by Western Electric.

== Centurion ==
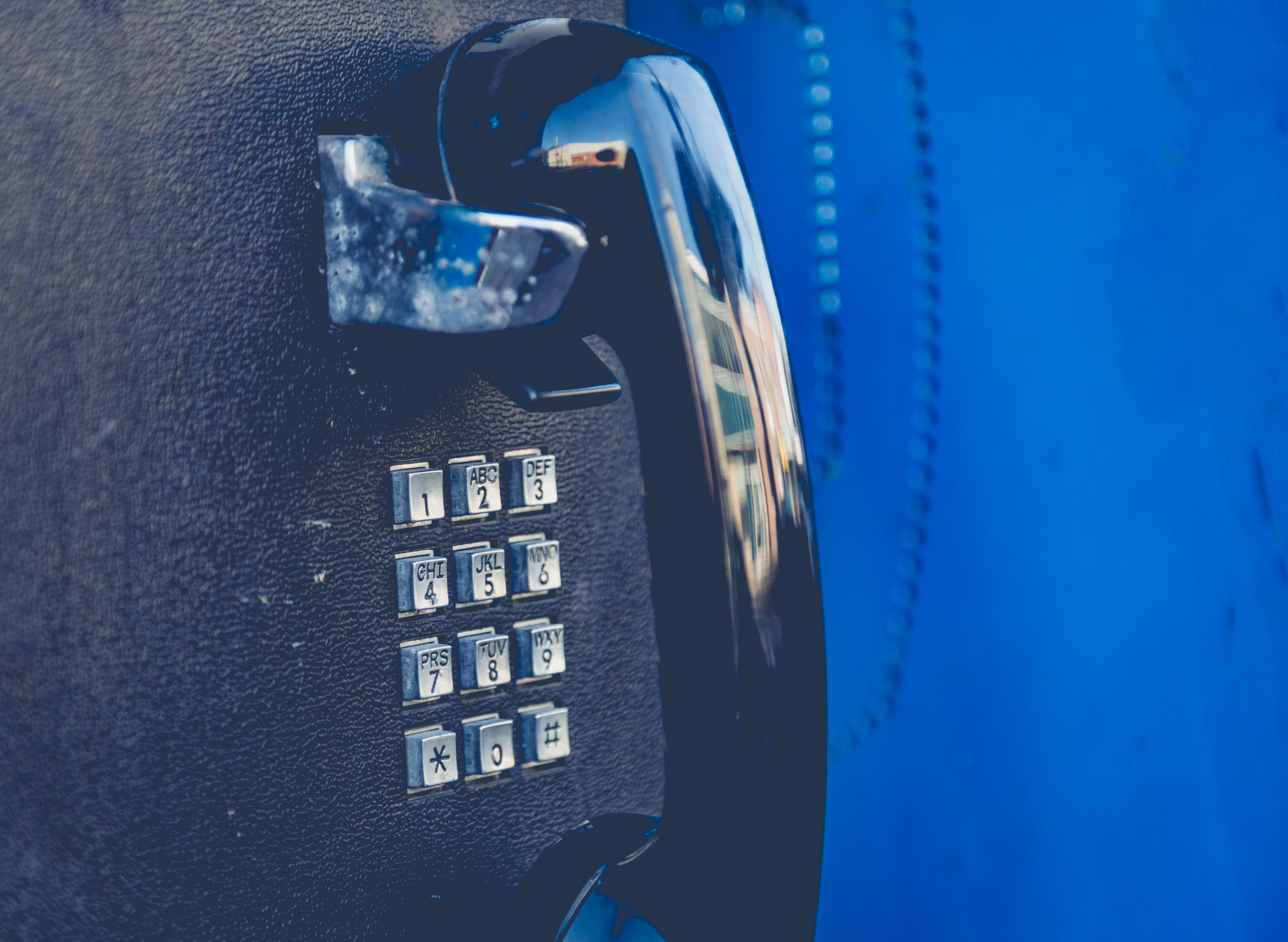
dial pad from Centurion payphone

Nortel Centurion were made in the 1970s–1980s and used coins only. They came in black, brown, blue, or green cases. Initial units used a rotary dial system and later units were touch tone key pad. Coin slot accepted denominations of 5, 10 and 25 cents. Centurions had a coin return button.

Centurion were used by Bell Canada, MTS, Telephone Milot and other local phone companies in Canada. Additionally, Centurions were used by companies in the United States such as Embarq, and a number of other independent telephone companies.

== Millennium ==
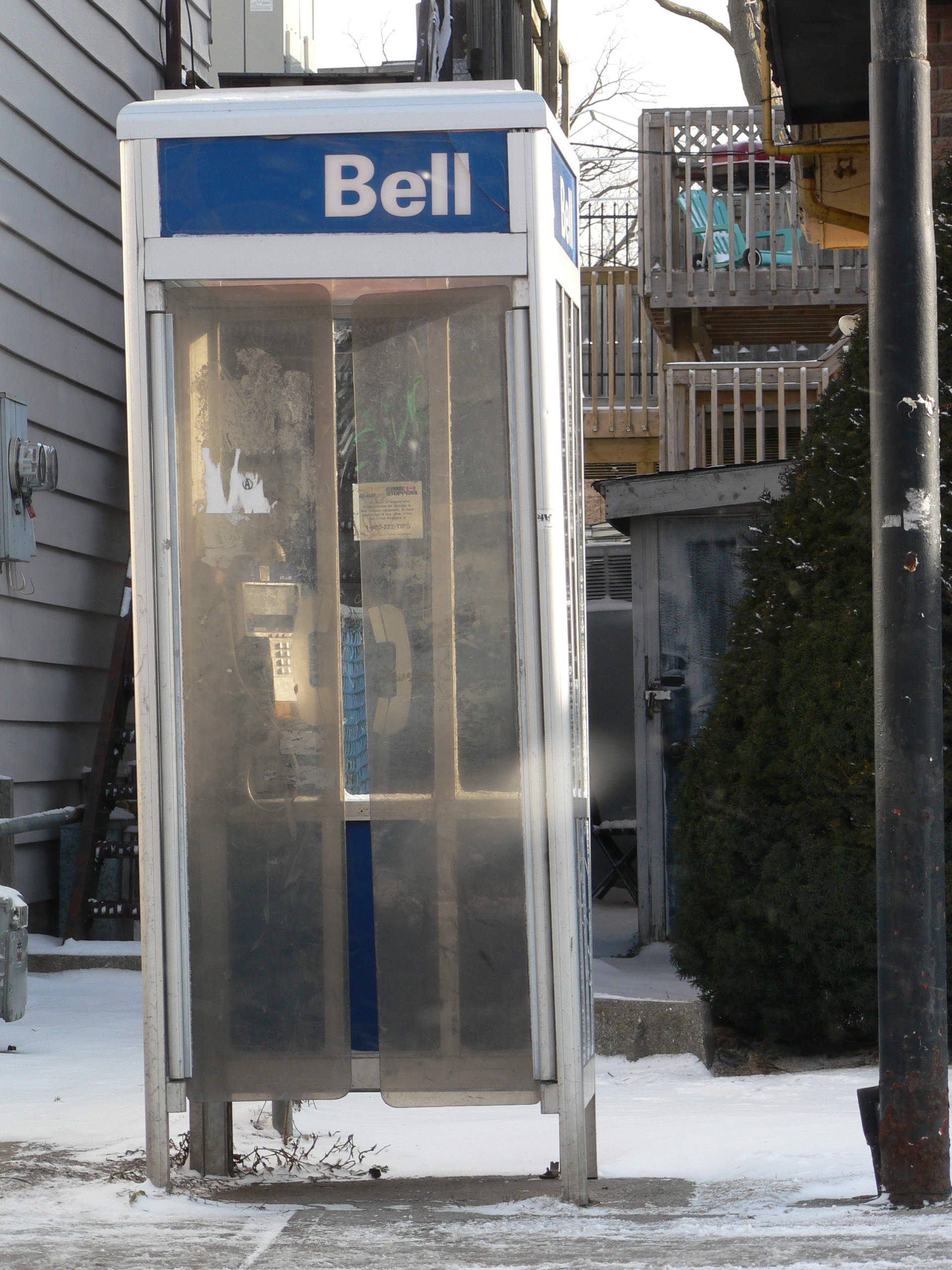
Bell Canada phone booth with Millennium phone visible

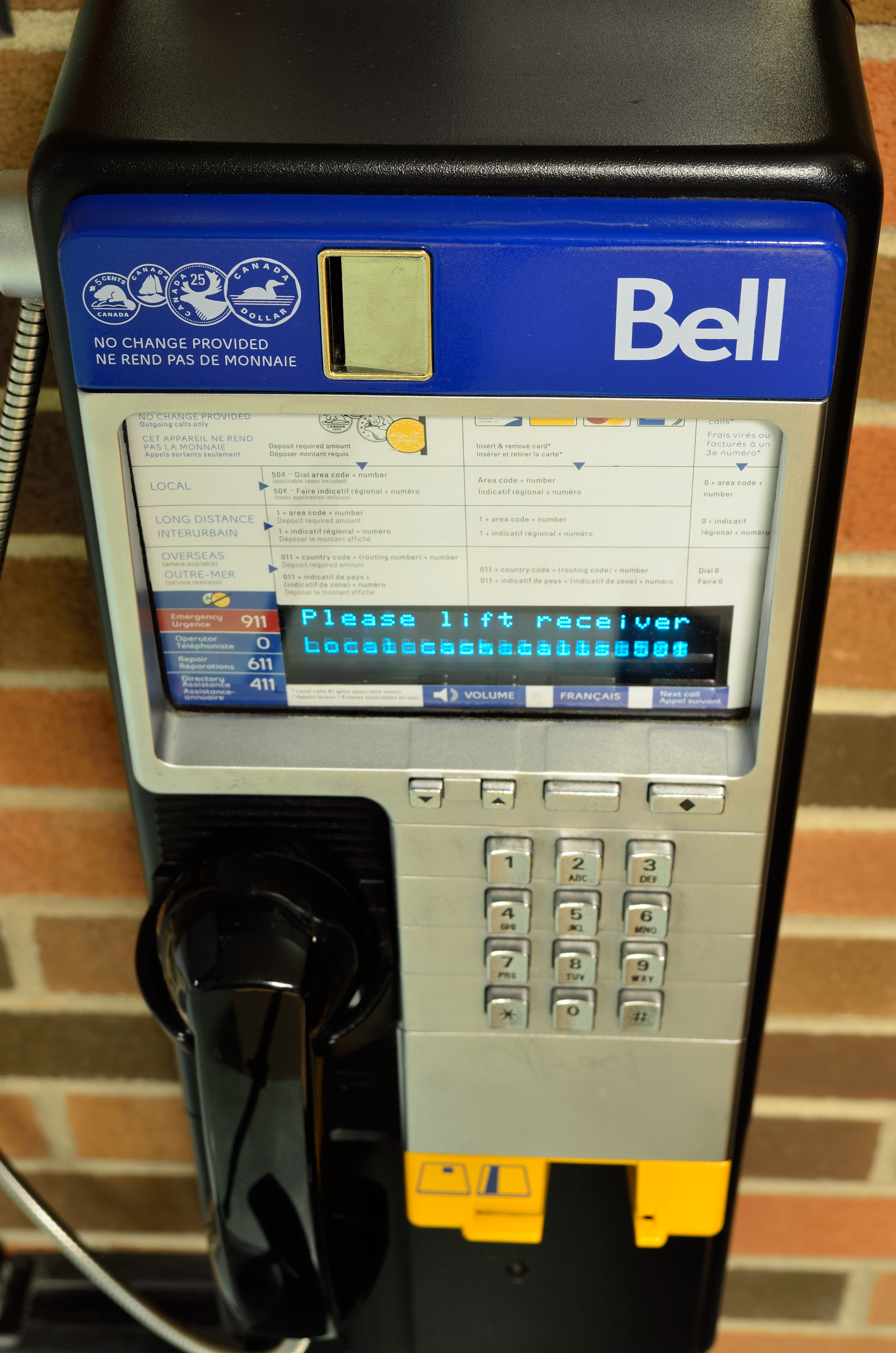
Bell Millennium phone

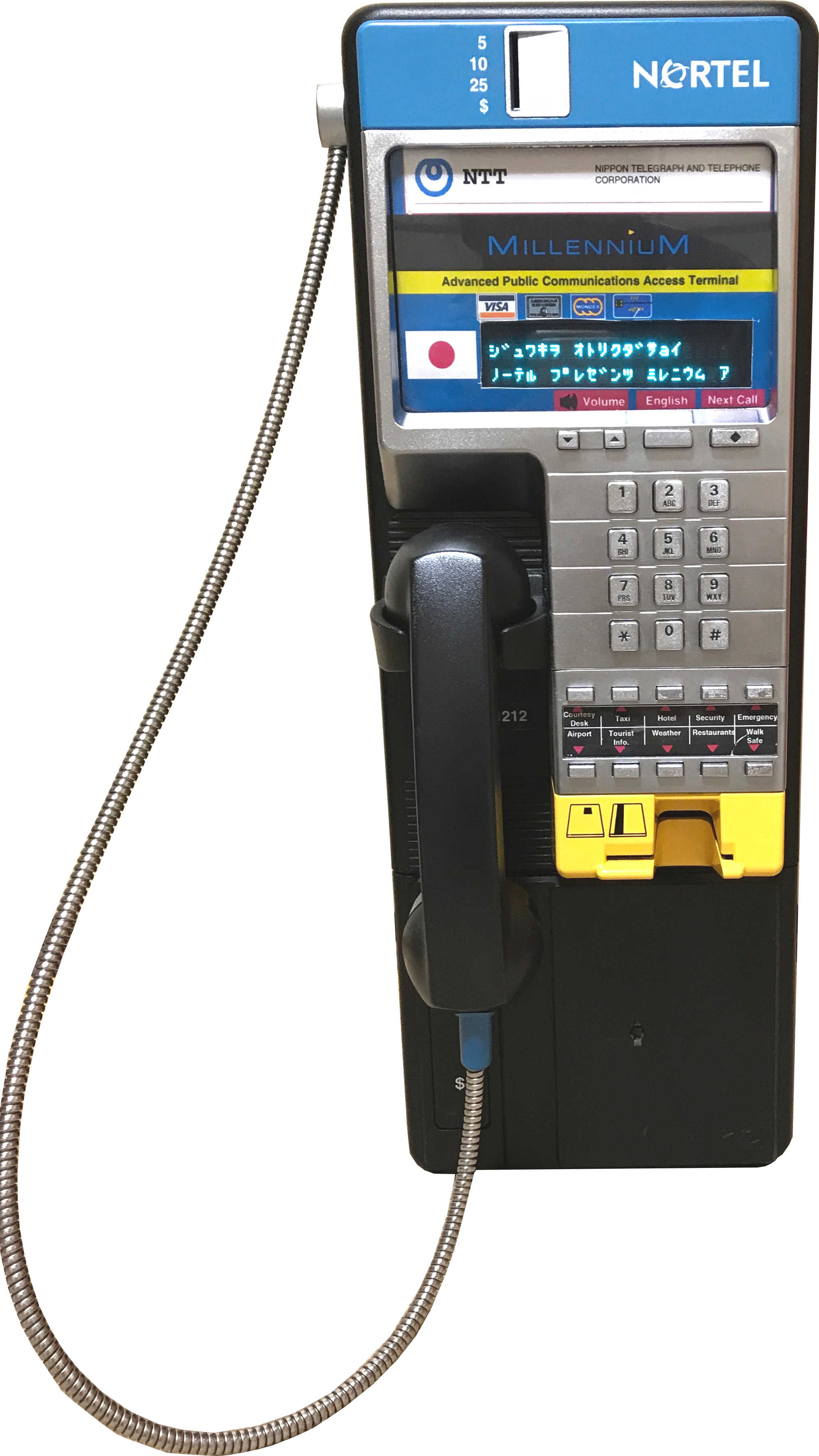
NORTEL MILLENNIUM for the Nippon Telegraph and Telephone Corporation, Japan

The Millennium line was introduced in the 1990s and allowed the use of coins (5, 10, 25 cents and 1 dollar coins) and/or cards (credit card or phone cards as well as "smart" chip cards.) They were equipped with an advanced electronic coin validator, which could detect slugs or coin blockages. These units came with a touch tone key pad only. A display screen allowed the user to view the number dialed and switch between two languages, where the operating company has a choice of any combination of English, French, Spanish and Japanese. The VFD display also allows the operating company to set scrolling messages and ads, with a total of 20 messages possible in total, 10 for on hook and 10 for off hook, 20 characters each. Additionally, a message can be attached to each of the quick-dial buttons (if available).

These units were or are still used by:

- Bell Canada
- Bell Aliant
- Telus
- Qwest
- Sprint
- Sasktel
- Telebec
- Telephone de Nantes
- Telephone de Warwick
- US West Express
- GTE
- Nevada Bell
- Embarq
- Cooptel
- Century Telephone
- FSH Communications

Millennium phones require a CO line with polarity reversal for CDR (call detail record) purposes, as well as for coin return, hence these phones have no coin return button.

The rights to Millennium phones were sold to QuorTech when Nortel moved away from manufacturing phone devices, and were subsequently sold to WiMacTel. Quortech has all but disappeared from the public and in March 2014, WiMacTel announced they were the only operator of Millennium payphones in Canada and the US.

The phones themselves are quite complex, using a Zilog Z180 processor with a number of peripherals attached. The whole point of the Millennium system was security and advanced monitoring. All Millennium phones connect to a server platform called Millennium Manager, which allows the operating company to control and monitor virtually every aspect of a phone. The phones 'call home' on a regular basis, uploading CDR records if they are full and reporting coinbox status (down to the amount of coins in a given denomination). The coin vault lock has a small micro switch that can detect break ins, which will cause the phone to call into the Millennium Manager with an alarm. The main housing lock also has a similar switch, which if triggered without entering the craft interface beforehand will trigger an alarm as well.

A Mondex version of the payphone was also produced with a special larger display and navigation keys. There is also an inmate version of the card only set, as well as a smaller deskset that used only a card reader. The desk set closely resembled a regular Meridian M7310 office phone. These smaller sets were often found in malls and hospitals.

The card readers were easily removed from the phone and often stolen and repurposed by hackers in systems like laundry machines and vending machines. Hackers found these readers could be adapted to a PC and then used to modify stored-value cards for small transactions, allowing them to bypass legitimate payment systems in various devices. This adaptability made the card readers a frequent target for theft and misuse.

These phones can sometimes be found on eBay for relatively cheap, though one cannot do much with them without the connection to the Millennium Manager. There are a few active projects which are trying to solve this problem however.

== See also ==
- Nortel business phones
