= PCM30 =

PCM30 describes an application of pulse-code modulation (PCM) in which 30 telephony analog signals are binary coded into a digital signal stream.

The term is used today mostly as a synonym for the encoding of 30 channels each with a signalling rate of 64-kbit/s. This rate is also used in the first stage of European PDH technique, so PCM30 is also known as E1. Originally it described a device in communications technology that converted the 30 analog telephone signals into a digital bit stream of 2048 kbit/s.

The pulse-code modulation (PCM) technology was patented and developed in France in 1938, but could not be used because suitable technology was not available until World War II. This came about with the arrival of digital systems in the 1960s when improving the performance of communications networks became a real possibility. However, this technology was not completely adopted until the mid-1970s, due to the large amount of analog systems already in place and the high cost of digital systems, as semiconductors were very expensive. PCM's initial goal was to convert an analog voice telephone channel into a digital one based on the sampling theorem.

== PDH and T-carrier ==
At the beginning of the 1960s, the proliferation of analog telephone lines, based on copper wires, together with the lack of space for new installations, led to the transmission experts to look at the real application of PCM digitalization techniques and TDM multiplexing. The first digital communications system was set up by Bell Labs in 1962, and consisted of 24 digital channels running at what is known as T1.

=== Basic Rates: T1 and E1 ===
In 1965, that permitted the TDM multiplexing of 24 digital telephone channels of 64 kbit/s into a 1.544-Mbit/s signal with a format called T1. For the T1 signal, a synchronization bit is added to the 24 TDM time slots, in such a way that the aggregate transmission rate is:

(24_{channels} × 8_{bit/ channel} + 1bit) / 125μs = 1.544 Mbps
(125 μs is the sampling period)

Europe developed its own TDM multiplexing scheme a little later (1968), although it had a different capacity: 32 digital channels of 64 kbit/s. The resulting signal was transmitted at 2.048 Mbit/s, and its format was called E1 which was standardized by the ITU-T and adopted worldwide except in the U.S., Canada, and Japan. For an E1 signal, the aggregate transmission rate can be obtained from the following equation:

(32_{channels} × 8_{bit / channel}) / 125μs = 2.048 Mbit/s

== PCM30 system ==
The PCM30-base system, the analog switching technology in Europe, and served on the digital transmission of telephone traffic. It has 30 coders, each with a phone channel in an 8-bit digital word (byte) that can be implemented. The 30 bytes are, together with a frame ID word, and a channel identifier, bytewise successively sent (see Multiplexer). Thus, a large 32-byte frame. In receiving direction, the 30 channels are, using a de-multiplexer, converted back to 30 analogue signals. The time slot 0 is used as a frame ID word, and as word detection is used. These are sent alternately. Time slot 16 is a channel identifier for the speech channels. Each voice channel is assigned 4 bits, one after the other in 16, there is an over-under with a frequency of 500 Hz and a length of 16 ⋅ 32 ⋅ 8 # 4096 bits.

== Operation summary ==
The analog input signals are initially passed through a low-pass filter. Then, the signals from the multiplexer are cyclically sampled at a frequency of 8 kHz. There is a PAM signal for all injected signals. This is after the A-curve audio friendly compressed and quantized by an analogue to digital (A/D) converter as an 8-bit binary word coded. Since 8000 samples each second, each with 8 bits to be made is that each bit stream at 64 kbit/s. The sum of all 32 channels #30 channels + 2 telephone management channels# the bit rate of 2048 kbit/s.

The transmission is still not a suitable binary signal. Conducted DC transmission requires freedom and constant synchronous information. The binary bit stream is therefore on the intermediate stage of the AMI code in the HDB3 code umcodiert. The entire bit stream of 32 Fernsprechkanälen is HDB3 encoded with 2.048 Mbit/s on the distant opposite body. Distances> 3.5 km with regenerators, the so-called Line equipment bridges.

Since 2005 in Almanya, no PCM30 lines on the HDB3 base provided. Instead, the 2B1Q - encoding used by the baud rate #Vs# at a constant transmission rate #VUE# in half and allows the signal to a lower frequency band to relocate. This in turn has a positive effect on the attenuation of the signal and its range.

== Specification of PCM30 system ==
Number of channels #time slots#: 32
Number of telephone channels: 30
Frame duration: 125 microseconds
Channel length: 3.9 microseconds
Bits per channel: 8 bit
Bit duration: 488 ns
Bitrate: 2048 kbit / s #2.048 Mbit / s#
Bit rate per channel: 64 kbit/s
Clock frequency: 8 kHz
