= Proceed-to-select =

Stage in establishing a telecommunication

In telecommunications, proceed-to-select is a signal or event in the call-access phase of a data call, which signal or event confirms the reception of a call-request signal and advises the calling data terminal equipment to proceed with the transmission of the selection signals.

Examples of proceed-to-select pertain to a dial tone in a telephone system.
