= Analog telephone adapter =

Type of telephone adapter

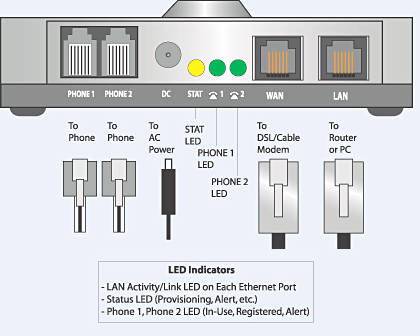
A typical analog telephone adapter for connecting an analog phone to a VoIP provider

Principle of an analog telephone adapter

An analog telephone adapter (ATA) or FXS gateway is a device for connecting traditional analog telephones, fax machines, and similar customer-premises devices to a digital telephone system or a voice over IP telephone network.

An ATA is often built into a small enclosure with an internal or external power adapter, an Ethernet port, and one or more foreign exchange station (FXS) telephone ports. Such devices may also have a foreign exchange office (FXO) interface for providing alternative access to traditional landline telephone service.

The ATA provides dial tone, ringing generator, DC power, caller ID data and other standard telephone line signaling (known collectively as BORSCHT) to the telephone connected to a modular jack.

The digital interface of the ATA typically consists of an Ethernet port to connect to an Internet Protocol (IP) network, but may also be a USB port for connecting the device to a personal computer.

Using such an ATA, it is possible to connect a conventional telephone to a remote VoIP server. The ATA communicates with the server using a protocol such as H.323, SIP, MGCP, SCCP or IAX, and encodes and decodes the voice signal using a voice codec such as G.711, G.729, GSM, or iLBC. Since the ATA communicates directly with the VoIP server, it does not require a personal computer or any software such as a softphone. It uses approximately 3 to 5 watts of electricity, depending on the model and brand.

Often an ATA is connected between an IP network (such as a broadband connection) and the existing telephone wiring of the residence through one of the jacks to provide public switched telephone network (PSTN) access.

== See also ==
- Telephone VoIP adapter
