= Wink pulsing =

Telephony signalling technique

Winking is a telephony signalling technique used both in connection with DC signalling on a trunk, and with indicator lamps on a key telephone.

In telephone switching systems, wink pulsing is recurring pulsing in which the off condition is relatively short compared to the on condition. In wink start trunks, the exchange at the originating seizes the trunk for an outgoing call. The terminating end indicates readiness to receive the dialled telephone number by sending an off-hook (current reversal) of approximately half a second duration, or "wink". Upon receiving this go ahead signal, the originating end uses multi-frequency, DTMF, or dial pulse signalling to send the phone number.

On 1A2 key systems or similar key-operated telephone instruments, the hold position, i.e., the hold condition, of a line is often indicated by winking the associated lamp at 120 impulses per minute. During 6% of the pulse period the lamp is off and 94% of the period the lamp is on, i.e., 30 ms (milliseconds) off and 470 ms on.
