= Telephone VoIP adapter =

Device to connect telephone handsets to a VoIP network

A telephone VoIP adapter (TVA), also called digital telephone adapter, is a device that interfaces digital private branch exchange (PBX) telephone sets to a Voice over Internet Protocol (VoIP) network, using, for example, the Session Initiation Protocol.

An analog telephone adapter (ATA) converts an analog telephone port (Foreign exchange station, FXS) to a VoIP network.

A Centrex TVA interfaces centrex telephones and analog-based Centrex telephones.

Some telecom manufacturers have produced hybrid exchanges with TVA-like elements that support IP telephones and also have units or cards that allow connection of digital telephones.

Whether a standalone TVA or a hybrid PBX is deployed, the intention is to preserve investment in an installed base of telephones, and eliminate the need to install Ethernet network infrastructure.
