= Pulse link repeater =

Telecommunications device

In telecommunications, a pulse link repeater (PLR) is a device that interfaces concatenated E and M signaling paths.

A PLR converts a ground, received from the E lead of one signal path, to −48 VDC, which is applied to the M lead of the concatenated signal path.

In many commercial carrier systems, the channel bank cards or modules have a "PLR" option that permits the direct concatenation of E&M signaling paths, without the need for separate PLR equipment.
