= Plain old telephone service =

Traditional analog landline telephone service

Plain old telephone service (POTS), or rarely publicly offered telephone service, is a retronym for voice-grade telephone service that employs analog signal transmission over copper loops.

The term encapsulates a technology that has been available since the introduction of the public telephone system in the late 19th century, remaining largely unchanged despite the introduction of innovations such as Touch-Tone dialing, electronic telephone exchanges and fiber-optic communication into the public switched telephone network (PSTN).

POTS was the standard service offering from telephone companies in the United States until around 1988, when the Integrated Services Digital Network (ISDN) Basic Rate Interface (BRI) was introduced, followed by the development of cellular telephone systems and voice over internet protocol (VoIP).

POTS has largely been phased out in many developed regions, though it remains in limited use in rural areas and legacy applications, including systems such as fire and security alarms, medical alert systems, fax machines and credit card machines.

In the United States and other countries, telecommunications providers have increasingly retired copper-based networks in favor of fiber-optic or wireless IP-based infrastructure. In 2026, AT&T reported that only 1% of the customers serviceable by its legacy copper-based voice telephone network still connect to it.

== Characteristics ==
Modern, automated POTS is characterized by several aspects:

- Bi-directional (full duplex) communications.
- Using balanced signaling of voltage analogs of sound pressure waves on a two-wire copper loop
- Restricted to a narrow frequency range of 300–3,300 Hz, called the voiceband, which is much less than the human hearing range of 20–20,000 Hz
- Call-progress tones, such as dial tone, busy signal, and ringback tone
- Pulse dialing and dual-tone multi-frequency signaling (DTMF)
- BORSCHT functions: battery feed (B), over-voltage protection (O), ringing (R), signaling (S), coding (C), hybrid (H), and test (T)
- Loop start, ground start and E&M signalling

The pair of wires from the central office switch to a subscriber's home is called a subscriber loop. It carries a direct current (DC) voltage at a nominal voltage of −48V when the receiver is on-hook, supplied by a power conversion system in the central office. This power conversion system is backed up with a bank of batteries, resulting in continuation of service during interruption of power to the customer supplied by their electrical utility. Ringing was achieved by superimposing a 60 to 105-volt RMS 20 Hz alternating current (AC) sine wave on top of the idle DC −48V line voltage.

The maximum resistance of the loop is 1,700 ohms, which translates into a maximum loop length of 18,000 feet or 5 km using standard 24- gauge wire. (Longer loops are often constructed with larger, lower-resistance 19-gauge wire and/or specialized central office equipment called a loop extender. They may be 50,000 feet [15 km] or more.)

Many calling features became available to telephone subscribers after computerization of telephone exchanges during the 1980s in the United States. The services include voicemail, caller ID, call waiting, speed dialing, conference calls (three-way calling), enhanced 911, and Centrex services.

The communication circuits of the public switched telephone network continue to be modernized by advances in digital communications; however, other than improving sound quality, these changes have been mainly transparent to customers. In most cases, the function of the local loop presented to the customer for connection to telephone equipment is practically unchanged and remains compatible with pulse dialing telephones.

Due to the wide availability of traditional telephone services, new types of communications devices, such as modems and fax machines, were initially designed to use traditional analog telephony to transmit digital information.

== Historical services ==
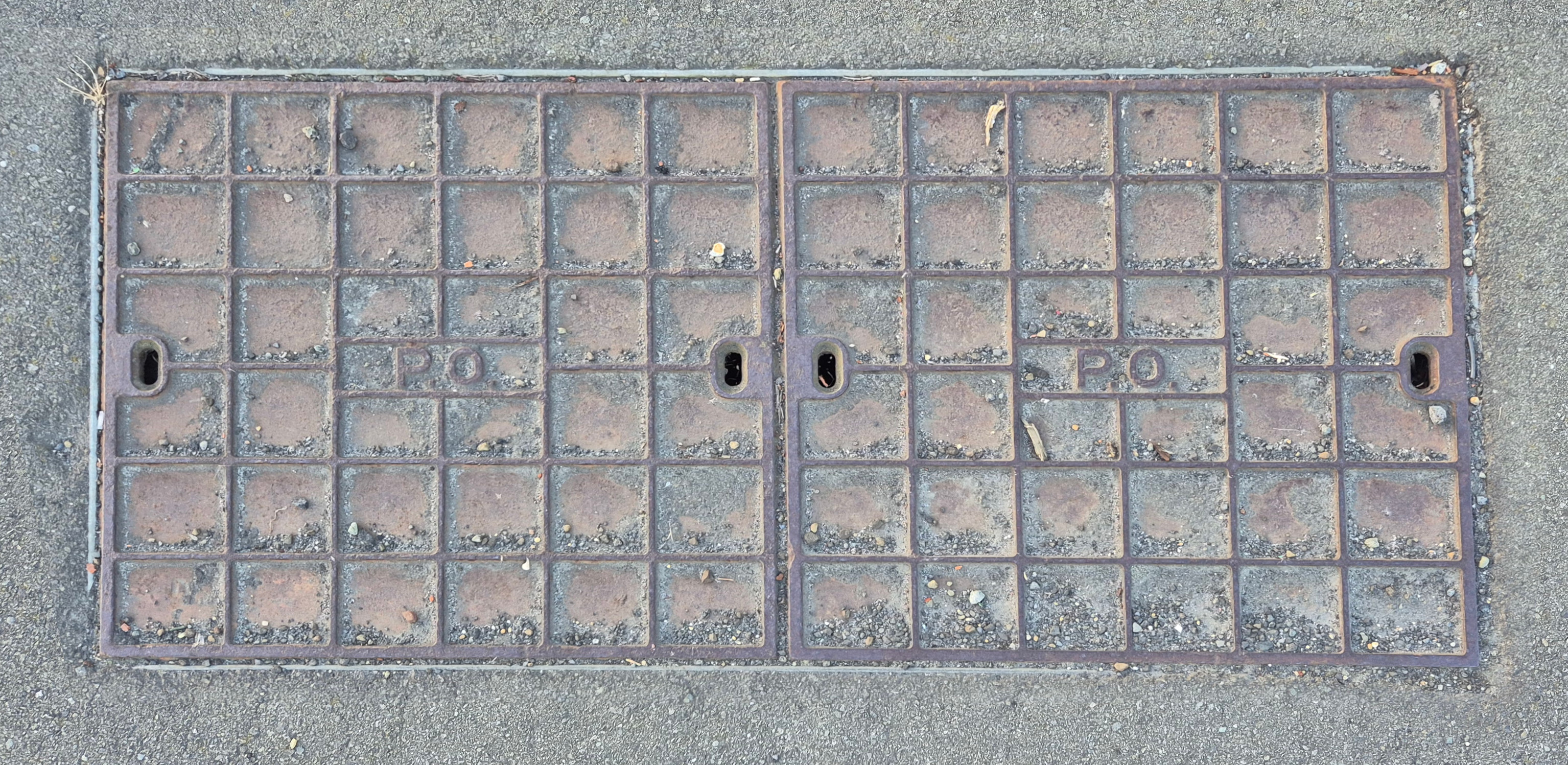
In many countries, the post office originally operated telephony systems: hence ubiquitous "PO" markings on historical telephone infrastructure in many countries

In countries where telephone systems were originally operated by the postal service administrations, the systems were known as post office telephone service as early as 1912 In Australia, New Zealand, and the United Kingdom the telephone system was a government service, under Post Office control, until privatisation in the 1970s and 1980s.

== See also ==
- 25-pair color code
- Basic exchange telecommunications radio service
- Category 1 cable
- Dual-tone multi-frequency signaling
- Local telephone service
- Managed facilities-based voice network
- Network interface device
- Publicly Available Telephone Services
- Registered jack – the type of telephone jack common in most of the world for single-line POTS telephones
- Twisted pair, used as cabling in POTS
- Landline
