= BORSCHT =

Functions performed by a subscriber line interface circuit in telephone service

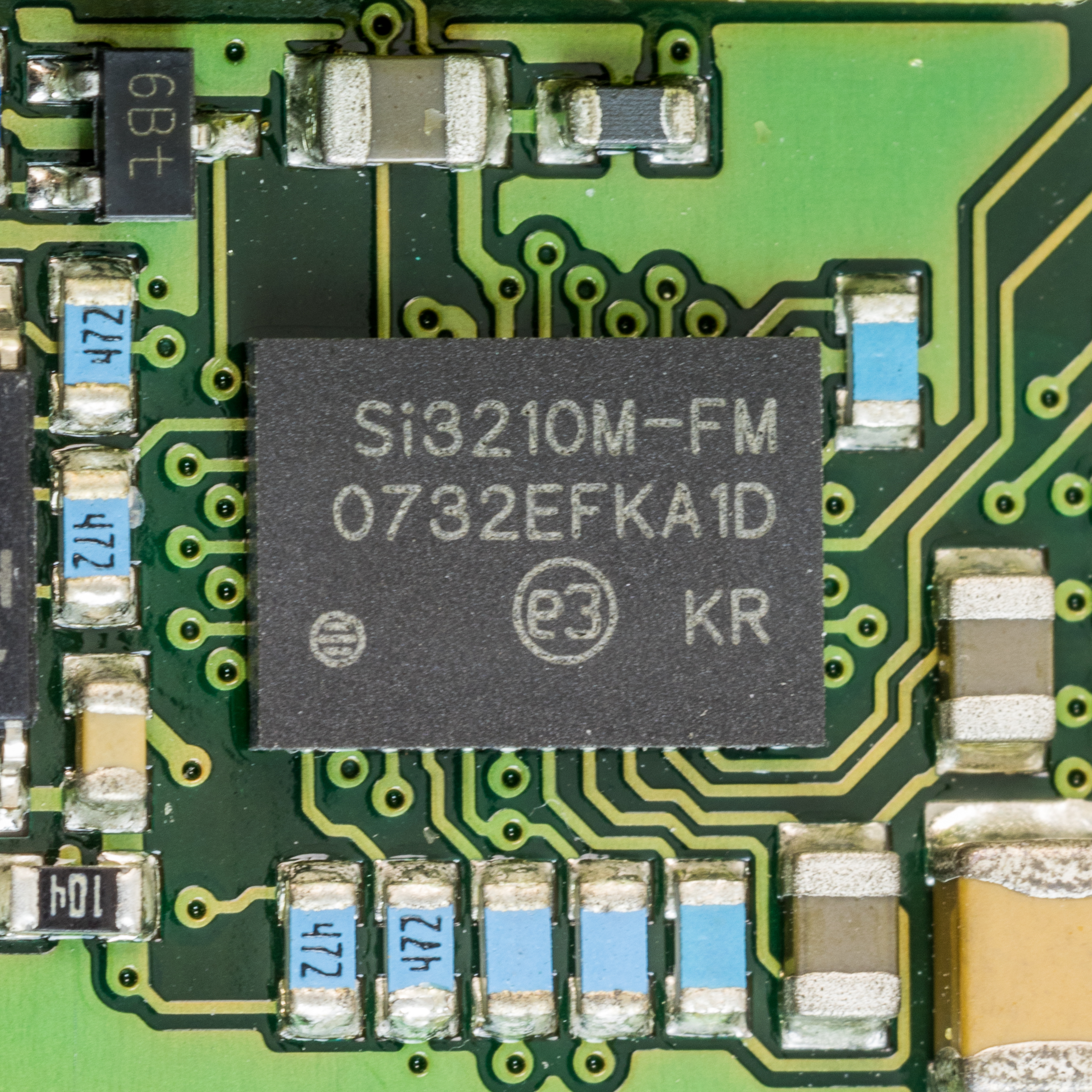
Silicon Laboratories Si3210M-FM - Programmable CMOS SLIC/Codec with Ringing/Battery Voltage Generation (Performs all BORSCHT functions)

BORSCHT is an acronym for the set of functions performed by a subscriber line interface circuit (SLIC) in the line card of a telecommunication system providing plain old telephone service. The letters represent the following functions: battery feed (B), overvoltage protection (O), ringing (R), signaling (S), coding (C), hybrid (H), and test (T).

An earlier or alternate version of the acronym is BORSHT, lacking the letter C for the coding function.

== Functions ==
Battery feed
The central office provides a DC voltage level of nominally 48 V between the tip and ring conductors for talk and signaling current. The available DC current may range from 15 mA to 80 mA.
Over-voltage protection
Aerial lines may be struck by lightning or falling power lines, consequently arrestors such as gas tubes and carbon blocks are used in the central office to reduce the voltage. However the line card must typically be able to withstand 1000 volt spikes.
Ringing
The ringing voltage is typically 86 V (RMS) at a frequency of 20 Hz, 2 seconds ON, 4 seconds OFF. Some selective frequency systems used frequencies as low as 16 Hz and as high as 66 Hz for station selection.
Signaling
Signaling is often referred to as supervision. The circuit detects the on-hook and off-hook conditions by monitoring the loop current. In rotary dial systems, it decodes dial pulses. It includes decoding of dual-tone multi-frequency (DTMF) dialing, hook flash, and other signals.
Coding
Coding includes μ-Law coding in North America and A-Law coding in Europe. This includes the A/D and D/A conversion, companding and framing for time-division multiplexing.
Hybrid
The hybrid function involves two-wire to four-wire circuit conversions. This was originally performed by a hybrid transformer (induction coil) but has largely been superseded by DSP devices.
Test
External tests allow the local loop and handset to be directly connected to test equipment in the central office. Loop-in tests could measure the input return loss (IRL). Loop-around tests measure the hybrid and codec performance.

== See also ==
- Loop start
- Codec
- Hybrid coil
- Line card
- Private branch exchange (PBX)
