= Clearing (telecommunications) =

Telecommunications term with multiple senses

Clearing, in telecommunications means:

- A sequence of events used to disconnect a telephone call and return to the ready state for the next call setup. It is sometimes, particularly in the context of common-channel signaling, called teardown.
- Removal of data from an automated information system (AIS), its storage devices, and other peripheral devices with storage capacity, in such a way that the data may not be reconstructed using normal system capabilities (i.e. through the keyboard).

Note: An AIS need not be disconnected from any external network before clearing takes place. Clearing enables a product to be reused within, but not outside of, a secure facility. It does not produce a declassified product by itself, but may be the first step in the declassification process.

== See also ==
- Disengagement originator – User or execution unit that initiates a disengagement attempt
- National Information Assurance Glossary – Government glossary of information-security terms
