= On- and off-hook =

Telephone respectively off- and on-line

In telephony, on-hook and off-hook are two states of a communication circuit. On subscriber telephones the states are produced by placing the handset onto or off the hookswitch. Placing the circuit into the off-hook state is also called seizing the line. Off-hook originally referred to the condition that prevailed when telephones had a separate earpiece (receiver), which hung from its switchhook until the user initiated a telephone call by removing it. When off hook the weight of the receiver no longer depresses the spring-loaded switchhook, thereby connecting the instrument to the telephone line.

== Off-hook ==
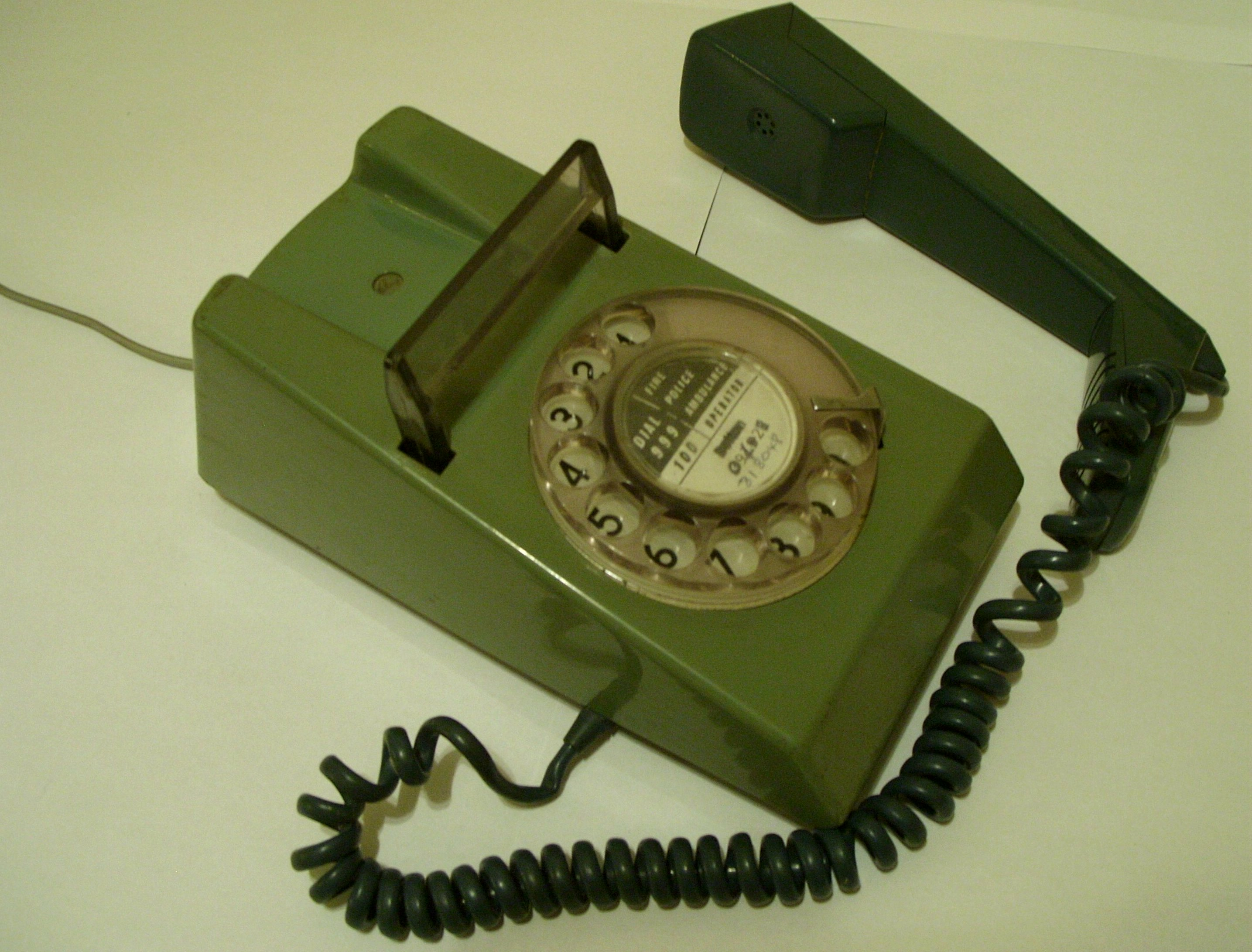
Off hook telephone.

The term off-hook has the following meanings:

- The condition that exists when a telephone or other user instrument is in use, i.e., during dialing or communicating.
- A general description of one of two possible signaling states at an interface between telecommunications systems, such as tone or no tone and ground connection versus battery connection. Note that if off-hook pertains to one state, on-hook pertains to the other.
- The active state (i.e., a closed loop (short circuit between the wires) of a subscriber line or PBX user loop)
- An operating state of a communications link in which data transmission is enabled either for (a) voice or data communications or (b) network signaling.

On an ordinary two-wire telephone line, off-hook status is communicated to the telephone exchange by a resistance short across the pair. When an off-hook condition persists without dialing, for example because the handset has fallen off or the cable has been flooded, it is treated as a permanent loop or permanent signal.

The act of going off-hook is also referred to as seizing the line or channel.

== On-hook ==
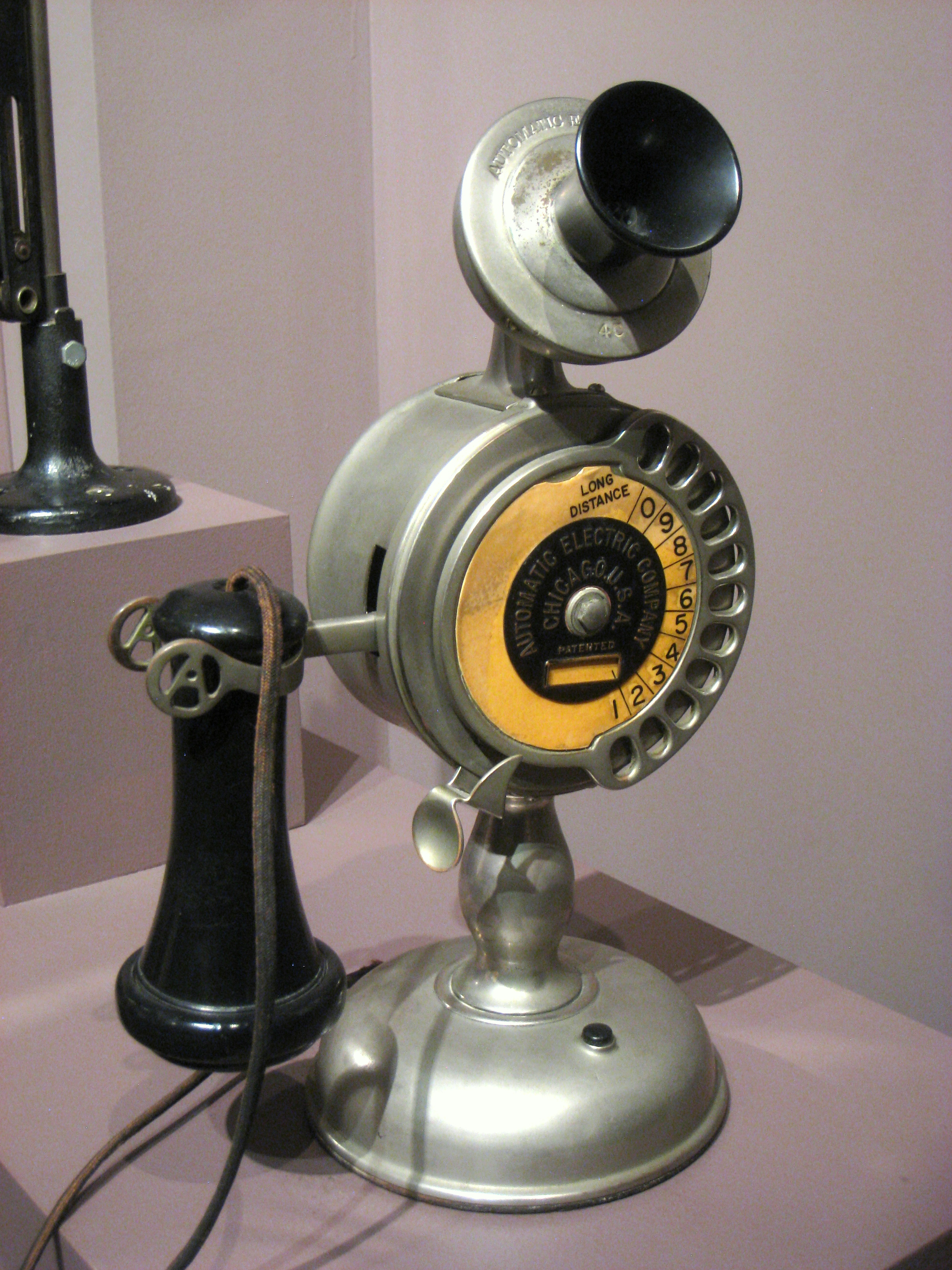
1907 dial telephone, receiver on its hook

The term on-hook has the following meanings:

- The condition that exists when a telephone or other user instrument is not in use, i.e., when idle waiting for a call. Note: on-hook originally referred to the storage of an idle telephone receiver, i.e., separate earpiece, on a switchhook. The weight of the receiver depresses the spring-loaded switchhook thereby disconnecting the idle instrument (except its bell) from the telephone line.
- One of two possible signaling states, such as tone or no tone, or ground connection versus battery connection. Note: if on-hook pertains to one state, off-hook pertains to the other.
- The idle state, i.e., an open loop of a subscriber line or PBX user loop.
- An operating state of a telecommunication circuit in which transmission is disabled and a high impedance, or "open circuit", is presented to the link by the end instrument(s). Note: during the on-hook condition, the link is responsive to ringing signals.

The act of going on-hook is also referred to as releasing the line or channel, and may initiate the process of clearing.

== See also ==
- Disconnect supervision
- Hook flash
- Line signaling
- Off-hook tone
