= ToneScript =

ToneScript is a description syntax for the characteristics of call-progress tones.

A call progress tone is a pattern of audible tones played to the caller in a telephone call, conveying the status of the call. ToneScript describes the pattern of frequency, cadence, and level of the signal. Many Internet telephony devices support configuration options for users to customize the tones, but standard patterns are provided for various telephone administrations. ToneScript is used in Sipura, Linksys and Cisco family of IP telephony products.

== Format ==
- A ToneScript syntax may have at most 120 characters.
- A calling tone may use up to 6 frequency components $n_k$ where $1 <= k <= 6$
- A cadence section $Z_i$ indicates its Duration $D_i$ followed by up to 6 subsections $ZZ_{i,j}$ in parentheses. A subsection consists of an ON duration (* for always on), an OFF duration and the list of frequency components $f_{i,j}$ used in that subsection.

$$f_{i,j} := n_1[+n_2[+n_3[+n_4[+n_5[+n_6]]]]]$$
$$ZZ_{i,j} := on_{i,j}/off_{i,j}/f_{i,j}$$
$$Z_i := D_i([ZZ_{i,1} [,ZZ_{i,2} [,ZZ_{i,3} [,ZZ_{i,4} [,ZZ_{i,5} [,ZZ_{i,6}]]]]])$$

- A FreqScript is a sequence of frequencies $F_i$ in hertz and their corresponding levels $L_i$ in dBm
  $FreqScript:=F_1$@$L_1[,F_2$@$L_2]$
- A Tone Script has a frequency specification and one or two cadence sections.

$$ToneScript:=FreqScript;Z_1[;Z_2]$$

== Examples ==
- 350@-19,440@-19;10(*/0/1+2)
  Contains 2 frequency components
  Frequency component 1 is 350 Hz at -19 dBm
  Frequency component 2 is 440 Hz at -19 dBm
  There is 1 Cadence Section
  In this section, The duration is 10 seconds and the tone has only 1 subsections
  In the only subsection the tone is always on, off for 0 seconds, and composed of both the Frequency components 1 and 2 (350 Hz and 440 Hz)
- 350@-19,440@-19;2(.2/.2/1+2);10(*/0/1+2)
  Contains 2 frequency components
  Frequency component 1 is 350 Hz at -19 dBm
  Frequency component 2 is 440 Hz at -19 dBm
  There are two Cadence Sections
  In the first Cadence Section, The duration is 2 seconds and the tone has only 1 subsections
  In the only subsection the tone is on for 0.2 seconds, off for 0.2 seconds, and composed of both the Frequency components 1 and 2 (350 Hz and 440 Hz)
  In the second Cadence Section, The duration is 10 seconds and again the tone has only 1 subsections
  In the only subsection the tone is always on, off for 0 seconds, and composed of both the Frequency components 1 and 2 (350 Hz and 440 Hz)
- 349@-21,392@-21,440@-21,466@-21,523@-24,540@-24;2.1(.6/0/3,.2/0/2,.7/0/1,.2/0/2,.2/0/3,.3/0/4);30(*/0/5+6)
  Christmas theme dialtone (seven notes of ′The First Noel′ then continuous dialtone for 30 seconds)
  Contains 6 frequency components
  Frequency components are 349, 392, 440, 466, 523 and 540 Hz (five musical notes) plus a beat frequency tone mix to give a warble dialtone beat thereafter.
  There are two Cadence Sections
  In the first Cadence Section, the total duration is 2.1 seconds and the tone has 6 subsections with timing set for music.
  The tones are turned on and off to give the ′notes′ of the familiar Christmas carol.
  In the second Cadence Section, the duration is 30 seconds. It combines tones 5 and 6 to give the last note and the familiar 17 Hz beat of dialtone.
- 392@-19,440@-19,494@-19,294@-19,457@-19;3.5(.7/0/4,.8/0/1,.6/0/1,.5/0/3,.7/0/2,.2/0/1);30(*/0/2+5)
  New Year theme dialtone (four notes of ′Auld Lang Syne′ then continuous dialtone for 30 seconds)
  Contains 5 frequency components
  Frequency components are 392, 440, 494, 292 and 457 Hz (four musical notes) plus a beat frequency tone mix to give a warble dialtone beat thereafter.
  There are two Cadence Sections
  In the first Cadence Section, the total duration is 3.5 seconds and the tone has 6 subsections with timing set for music.
  The tones are turned on and off to give the ′notes′ of the familiar New Year's Eve tune.
  In the second Cadence Section, the duration is 30 seconds. It combines tones 4 and 5 to give the last note in the familiar 17 Hz beat of dialtone.

== North American tones ==
Name	ToneScript
Dial tone	350@-19,440@-19;10(*/0/1+2)
Second dial tone	350@-19,440@-19;10(*/0/1+2)
Outside dial tone	450@-19,550@-19;10(*/0/1+2)
Prompt tone	520@-19,620@-19;10(*/0/1+2)
Busy tone	480@-19,620@-19;10(.5/.5/1+2)
Reorder tone	480@-19,620@-19;10(.25/.25/1+2)
Howler/off-hook warning tone	480@-10,620@0;10(.125/.125/1+2)
Audible ringing	440@-19,480@-19;*(2/4/1+2)
Confirm tone	600@-16;1(.25/.25/1)
Special information tone SIT1	985@-16,1428@-16,1777@-16;20(.380/0/1,.380/0/2,.380/0/3,0/4/0)
Special information tone SIT2	914@-16,1371@-16,1777@-16;20(.274/0/1,.274/0/2,.380/0/3,0/4/0)
Special information tone SIT3	914@-16,1371@-16,1777@-16;20(.380/0/1,.380/0/2,.380/0/3,0/4/0)
Special information tone SIT4	985@-16,1371@-16,1777@-16;20(.380/0/1,.274/0/2,.380/0/3,0/4/0)
MWI dial tone	350@-19,440@-19;2(.1/.1/1+2);10(*/0/1+2)
Call forward dial tone	350@-19,440@-19;2(.2/.2/1+2);10(*/0/1+2)
Holding tone	600@-19;*(.1/.1/1,.1/.1/1,.1/9.5/1)
Conference call tone	350@-19;20(.1/.1/1,.1/9.7/1)
Call waiting tone	440@-10;30(.3/9.7/1)

== Australian tones ==
Name	ToneScript
Dial tone	400@-19,425@-19;20(*/0/1+2)
Busy tone	425@-19;30(.375/.375/1)
Reorder tone	425@-19,425@-29;60(.375/.375/1,.375/.375/2)
Ringback tone	400@-19,425@-19,0@-19;*(.4/.2/1+2,.4/.2/1+2,0/2/3)
Confirm tone	425@-16;2(1/1/1)
MWI dial tone	400@-19,425@-19;20(.100/.040/1+2)
Cfwd dial tone	425@-19;20(*/0/1)
Conference tone	525@-16;2.5(.3/0/3,1/1/1)
Call waiting tone	425@-25,0@-25;30(.2/.2/1,.2/.2/1,0/4.4/3)

== Ireland tones ==
Name	ToneScript
Dial tone (ETSI standard)	425@-17;60(*/0/1)
Second dial tone	335@-19,425@-19;45(*/0/1+2)
Busy tone (ETSI standard)	425@-19; 30(0.5/0.5/1)
Reorder tone (ETSI standard)	425@-19; 30(.2/.2/1)
Ringback tone (same as UK, NZ etc.)	400@-19,450@-19;*(.4/.2/1+2,.4/.2/1+2,2/0/0)
Special information tone SIT (ETSI standard)	950@-16,1400@-16,1800@-16;20(.330/0/1,.330/0/2,.330/0/3,0/1/0)
MWI dial tone	425@-19;2(.1/.1/1);58(*/0/1)
Call forward dial tone	400@-16,432@-18;30(0.4/0/1,0.4/0/2)
Call waiting tone	425@-19;30(.3/9.7/1)
Confirm tone / routing tone	425@-19;1.5(0.06/0.06/1);
Prompt tone	335@-19,425@-19;20(*/0/1+2)

(ETSI standard) is indicated where tones are in compliance with European Telecommunications Standards Institute recommendations.
