= Call-progress tone =

Telephony signal

In telephony, call progress tones are audible tones that provide an indication of the status of a telephone call to the user. The tones are generated by a central office or a private branch exchange (PBX) to the calling party.

Telecommunication equipment such as fax machines and modems are designed to recognize certain tones, such as dial tone and busy tone.

The ITU-T E.180 and E.182 recommendations define the technical characteristics and intended usage of some of these tones. ToneScript is a tone description format that may be used to specify the tone. Many European systems follow the recommendations of the European Telecommunications Standards Institute (ETSI).

== Types ==
- Busy tone (or busy signal)
- Comfort tone
- Conference call tone
- Confirmation tone
- Congestion tone
- Dial tone
- Disconnect tone
- End of three-party service tone (three-way calling)
- Executive override tone
- Holding tone
- Preemption tone
- Queue tone
- Recall dial tone
- Record tone
- Recorder warning tone
- Reorder tone
- Ringback tone
- Ringtone
- Second dial tone
- Special dial tone
- Special information tone (SIT)
- Stutter dial tone (used as a message-waiting indicator)
- Zip tone (or Call waiting tone)

== Regional and national standards ==
National telephone systems define tones to indicate the status of lines, equipment, or the result of calls with special tones. Such tones are generally standardized in each country, and may consist of single or multiple frequencies.

Most European countries have harmonised to a system of tones based on a single 425 Hz, while the United States uses a dual-frequency system. Exceptions exist, notably in private networks and on some voice over IP (VoIP) equipment. In Europe, some countries maintain national exceptions based on established older standards and have not fully adopted ETSI recommendations.

The most notable exceptions are found in the U.K. (distinct system of tones see table below), Ireland (British style ringback tone), Italy (non continuous dial tone) and France (tone frequencies at 440Hz).

Outside of Europe and North America, tone plans vary from country to country but are usually similar enough to be easily recognised by end users calling from abroad and by automatic dialling equipment, such as fax machines and modems.

Many countries have adopted plans similar to those recommended by the ETSI, others have influences from North American or British standards, while some like Japan and Australia are unique to those countries.

In many cases, when calling from abroad, busy, reorder and other call failure tones may be played by the local switch. Modern signalling protocols like SS7 send this information digitally; thus only a ringback tone or announcement generated by a distant switch in a foreign network will ever be heard by callers from other countries or networks.

Mobile phones roaming on a foreign network will often be provided with a ringback tone from the network they are temporarily hosted on. For example, calling a US phone in Europe may return a European ringback tone or vice versa. Increasingly, networks may opt to play their own domestic tones instead, making roaming seamless. In this case the ringing state is sent by the host network and the tone is generated by the home network.

In some instances, the tones are entirely generated by the local network or even by the telephone itself; this is increasingly common on VoIP-based services. In this case no distantly generated tones will be heard.

The use of signalling protocols rather than audible tones means that a voice channel to the distant switch is unnecessary unless a call is connected. This saves network bandwidth, switch capacity and is often more user friendly as it can provide local tones or even on-screen feedback to end users.

=== North American tones ===
Event	Low frequency	High frequency
Busy signal (US)	480 Hz	620 Hz
Dial tone (US)	350 Hz	440 Hz
Ringback tone (US)	440 Hz	480 Hz
Zip tone (US)	440 Hz	-

The tone frequencies, as defined by the precise tone plan, are selected such that harmonics and intermodulation products will not cause an unreliable signal. No frequency is a multiple of another, the difference between any two frequencies does not equal any of the frequencies, and the sum of any two frequencies does not equal any of the frequencies. The frequencies were initially designed with a ratio of 21/19, which is slightly less than a whole tone. The frequencies may not vary more than ±1.8% from their nominal frequency, or the switching center will ignore the signal. The high frequencies may be the same volume as – or louder than – the low frequencies when sent across the line. The loudness difference between the high and low frequencies can be as large as 3 decibels (dB) and is referred to as "twist." The duration of the tone should be at least 537 ms.

=== ETSI guidelines (EU) ===
Event	Fq 1	Fq 2	Fq 3	Cadence	ETSI Harmonised
Dial tone	425 Hz	----	----	Continuous	Yes
Ringing tone (Ringback tone)	425 Hz	----	----	On 1.0s, Off 4s	Yes
Busy signal	425 Hz	----	----	On 0.5s, Off 0.5s	Yes
Congestion or reorder tone	425 Hz	----	----	On 0.25s, Off 0.25s	Yes
Special information tone (SIT)	950 Hz	1400 Hz	1800 Hz	Fq 1 On 0.33s, Fq 2 On 0.33s, Fq 3 On 0.33s, Off 1.0s	Yes
Zip tone (call waiting tone)	425 Hz	----	----	On 0.2s, Off 0.6s, On 0.2s, Off 3s	Yes
Call dropped (GSM/3GPP) Radio path not available	425 Hz	----	----	On 0.20s, Off 0.20s repeated 3 times	Yes

==== EU national exceptions to harmonised ETSI ====
Country	Exception	Fq 1	Fq 2	Fq 3	Cadence	ETSI harmonised
Ireland	Ringing tone UK tone	400 Hz	450 Hz	----	Fq 1 & Fq 2 On 0.4s, off 0.2, On 0.4s, Off 2.0s	No and no plans to harmonise announced.
France	All tones – frequency	440 Hz	----	----	----	No, but harmonisation announced.
Italy	Dial tone – cadence	425 Hz	----	----	On 0.2s, Off 0.2s, On 0.6s, Off 1s	No and no plans to harmonise announced.

=== UK tones ===
Event	Fq 1	Fq 2	Fq 3	Cadence
Dial tone	350 Hz	450 Hz	----	Continuous
Busy signal	400 Hz	----	----	On 0.75s, Off 0.75s
Ringing tone	400 Hz	450 Hz	----	On 0.4s, off 0.2, On 0.4s, Off 2.0s
Special information tone (SIT)	950 Hz	1400 Hz	1800 Hz	Fq 1 On 0.33s, Off 0.33s, Fq 2 On 0.33s, Off 0.33s, Fq 3 On 0.33s, Off 1.0s

=== Australian tones ===
Supervisory tones in the Australian PSTN are defined in AS/CA S002, published by the Communications Alliance.

Pre-answer tones	Frequency definition	Tone cadence
Dial tone A	425 Hz	continuous
Dial tone B	425 Hz, amplitude modulated by 25 Hz	continuous
Dial tone C	400 Hz + 425 Hz + 450 Hz	continuous
Dial tone D	400 Hz + 425 Hz	continuous
Dial tone E	413 Hz + 438 Hz	continuous
Ringback tone A	425 Hz, amplitude modulated by 25 Hz	0.4 s on, 0.2 s off, 0.4 s on, 2 s off
Ringback tone B	400 Hz + 450 Hz	0.4 s on, 0.2 s off, 0.4 s on, 2 s off
Ringback tone C	400 Hz + 425 Hz + 450 Hz	0.4 s on, 0.2 s off, 0.4 s on, 2 s off
Ringback tone D	413 Hz + 438 Hz	0.4 s on, 0.2 s off, 0.4 s on, 2 s off
Busy tone	425 Hz	0.375 s on, 0.375 s off
Number unobtainable tone	425 Hz	2.5 s on, 0.5 s off

Post-answer tones	Frequency definition	Tone cadence
Recording	1400 Hz	0.425 s burst, 15 s interval
Call waiting	425 Hz or 525 Hz	0.2 s on, 0.2 s off, 0.2 s on, 4.4 s off
Conference	425 Hz or 525 Hz or 1400 Hz	1.0 s on, 15 s off (1st), 0.36 s on, 15 s off (subsequent)
Number unobtainable tone	425 Hz	2.5 s on, 0.5 s off
