= Request line =

A request line is a telephone line which allows listeners to call a radio station, traditionally to request the disc jockey to play a specific piece of recorded music on-air. In the late 20th century, a large volume of listener requests for a specific song could help to turn it into a hit in the United States market. By the early 2000s, radio request line data was supplemented by a changing mix of other sources, such as online surveys, to help predict future hits.

== Telephone network ==
Although only one telephone number is usually announced, major stations typically have line hunting, with the same number being directed to any available one of several lines within the hunt group. If there are no open lines, the calling party may receive a busy signal as with an ordinary telephone call, or sometimes the special information tones followed by a recorded announcement that "all circuits are busy, please try your call again later". In this case, the line often first gives that caller a ringback tone as if the call were being completed, misleading callers to think they may have actually gotten through the swarm of other calls that sometimes flood these lines.

Within the North American Numbering Plan, telephone companies typically use special numbers for these lines, with a reserved prefix corresponding to high-capacity multi-line numbers instead of to a physical telephone exchange. In Miami, for example, numbers are 305-550-xxxx, while in metro Atlanta they are 404-741-xxxx. The last four digits are usually chosen by the station to be their callsign or frequency, or their moniker if it is short (such as B937 (2937) for a fictional B-93.7 FM). Several stations upon moving to new studios have abandoned these prefixes due to their dependence on older technologies.

When used on a radio or television program carried on a broadcast network, such a number is usually a toll-free telephone number, without a special number since it simply redirects to a local request line circuit. This allows anyone to call regardless of the location, even from a payphone. Some stations may have vertical service codes for use by mobile telephones. These are also common in the United States for TV stations to advertise for gathering news tips from the public, but are often specific to callers on a certain sponsoring mobile telephone company.

== Screening and editing ==
Calls typically come into the studio on a multi-line telephone system, which is equipped to connect callers to the audio console and onto the air via a telephone hybrid. However, in modern broadcasting, this is not always the case.

Call screeners may take the calls initially in an adjacent room (or simply away from the microphone), in order to determine which ones would get onto the air, with the screener entering the caller's name and city into the station's automation system to allow the on-air personality to introduce the caller. This in turn alerts the caller, who has often been on hold for several minutes and may be listening to the radio or TV instead of the line, that they are now on the air. Such a notification is often also a part of broadcast law if the caller may not have called with the expectation of being on the air.

A brief broadcast delay may be used to allow profanity or other inappropriate content (and possibly the caller) to be dropped, or voice tracking may be used to record calls to a computer, where the call can be digitally edited for time and content. Often with programs such as Delilah, the line may be active even when the show is not broadcasting and direct to an answering service where the screener will determine if the caller's request and story works with the show and help the caller provide a proper tone when they're on-air, and the host will speak to the caller during the day before the show airs to edit the call and seamlessly edit it into a show's timeline; as Delilah has multiple shows for different radio formats, this may mean that a call will not air on certain stations if the caller's song choice is incompatible with its usual playlist.

For call-in contests, the caller is often told immediately by the on-air personality while off-air if they have won while the song plays on-air, a live reaction is recorded for playback after the song ends, and while it airs on the radio, the caller's required information is being taken by the screener to make sure the caller is eligible to win the contest and to inform them of guidelines to pick up the prize.
