= Backbone network =

Computer network that connects other networks together

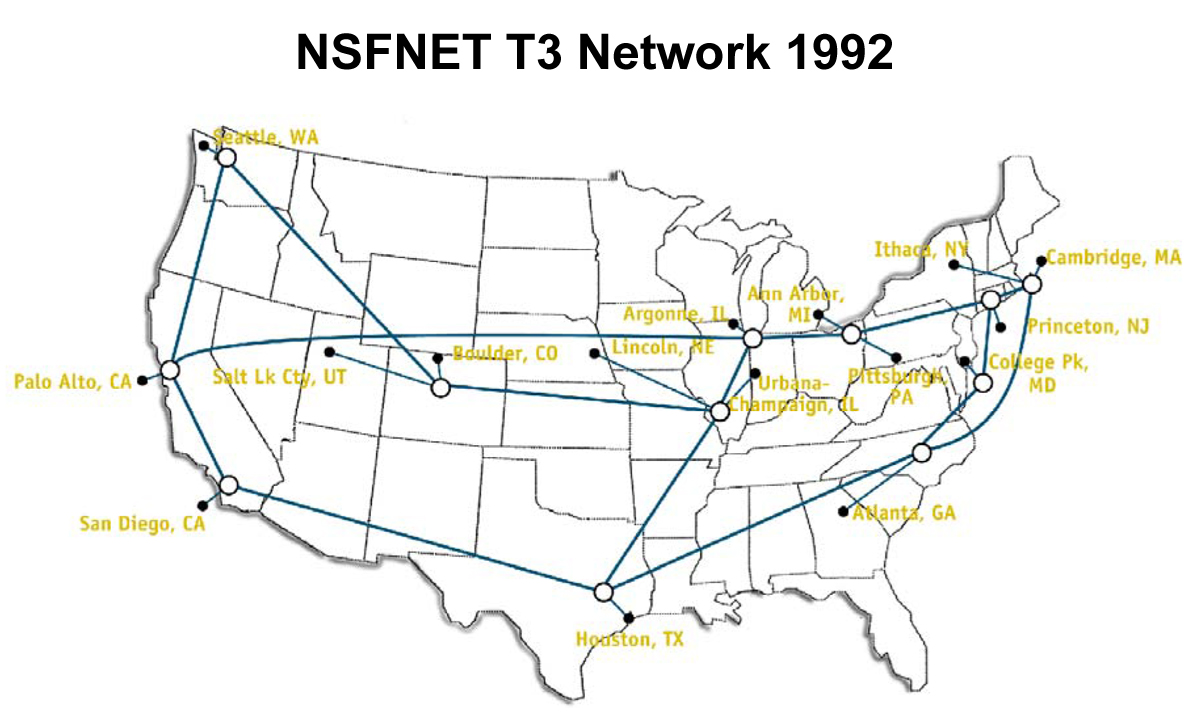
A diagram of a nationwide network backbone.

A backbone network or core network is a part of a computer network which interconnects networks, providing a path for the exchange of information between different LANs or subnetworks. A backbone can tie together diverse networks in the same building, in different buildings in a campus environment, or over wide areas. Normally, the backbone's capacity is greater than the networks connected to it.

A large corporation that has many locations may have a backbone network that ties all of the locations together; for example, if a server cluster needs to be accessed by different departments of a company that are located at different geographical locations. The pieces of the network connections (for example, Ethernet, wireless) that bring these departments together are often mentioned as the network backbone. Network congestion is often taken into consideration while designing backbones.

One example of a backbone network is the Internet backbone.

== History ==
The theory, design principles, and first instantiation of the backbone network came from the telephone core network when traffic was purely voice. The core network was the central part of a telecommunications network that provided various services to customers who were connected by the access network. One of the main functions was to route telephone calls across the PSTN.

Typically, the term referred to the high-capacity communication facilities that connect primary nodes. A core network provided paths for the exchange of information between different sub-networks.

In the United States, local exchange core networks were linked by several competing interexchange networks; in the rest of the world, the core network has been extended to national boundaries.

Core networks usually had a mesh topology that provided any-to-any connections among devices on the network. Many main service providers would have their own core/backbone networks that are interconnected. Some large enterprises have their own core/backbone network, which is typically connected to the public networks.

Backbone networks create links that allow long-distance transmission, usually 10 to 100 miles, and in certain cases, up to 150 miles. This makes backbone networks essential to providing long-haul Wireless solutions to provide internet service, especially to remote areas.

== Functions ==
Core networks typically provide the following functionality:

1. Aggregation: The highest level of aggregation in a service provider network. The next level in the hierarchy under the core nodes is the distribution networks and then the edge networks. Customer-premises equipment (CPE) does not normally connect to the core networks of a large service provider.
2. Authentication: The function to decide whether the user requesting a service from the telecom network is authorized to do so within this network or not.
3. Call control and switching: call control or switching functionality decides the future course of the call based on the call signaling processing. E.g., switching functionality may decide based on the "called number" that the call be routed towards a subscriber within this operator's network or, with number portability more prevalent, to another operator's network.
4. Charging: This functionality of the collation and processing of charging data generated by various network nodes. Two common types of charging mechanisms found in present-day networks are prepaid charging and postpaid charging. See Automatic Message Accounting
5. Service invocation: The core network performs the task of service invocation for its subscribers. Service invocation may happen based on some explicit action (e.g. call transfer) by the user or implicitly (call waiting). It's important to note however that service execution may or may not be a core network functionality, as third-party networks and nodes may take part in actual service execution.
6. Gateways: Gateways shall be present in the core network to access other networks. Gateway functionality is dependent on the type of network it interfaces with.

Physically, one or more of these logical functionalities may simultaneously exist in a given core network node.

Besides the above-mentioned functionalities, the following also formed part of a telecommunications core network:

- O&M: Network operations center and operations support systems to configure and provision the core network nodes. Number of subscribers, peak hour call rate, nature of services, and geographical preferences are some of the factors that impact the configuration. Network statistics collection, alarm monitoring and logging of various network nodes' actions also happen in the O&M center. These stats, alarms and traces form important tools for a network operator to monitor the network health and performance and improve the same.
- Subscriber database: The core network also hosts the subscriber database (e.g., HLR in GSM systems). The subscriber database is accessed by core network nodes for functions like authentication, profiling, service invocation, etc.

== Distributed backbone ==
A distributed backbone is a backbone network that consists of a number of connectivity devices connected to a series of central connectivity devices, such as hubs, switches, or routers, in a hierarchy. This kind of topology allows for simple expansion and limited capital outlay for growth, because more layers of devices can be added to existing layers. In a distributed backbone network, all of the devices that access the backbone share the transmission media, as every device connected to this network receives all transmissions placed on that network.

Distributed backbones, in all practicality, are in use by all large-scale networks. Applications in enterprise-wide scenarios confined to a single building are also practical, as certain connectivity devices can be assigned to certain floors or departments. Each floor or department possesses a LAN and a wiring closet with that workgroup's main hub or router connected to a bus-style network using backbone cabling. Another advantage of using a distributed backbone is the ability for network administrator to segregate workgroups for ease of management.

There is the possibility of single points of failure, referring to connectivity devices high in the series hierarchy. The distributed backbone must be designed to separate network traffic circulating on each individual LAN from the backbone network traffic by using access devices such as routers and bridges.

== Collapsed backbone ==
A conventional backbone network spans distance to provide interconnectivity across multiple locations. In most cases, the backbones are the links while the switching or routing functions are done by the equipment at each location. It is a distributed architecture.

A collapsed backbone (also known as inverted backbone or backbone-in-a-box) is a type of backbone network architecture. In the case of a collapsed backbone, each location features a link back to a central location to be connected to the collapsed backbone. The collapsed backbone can be a cluster or a single switch or router. The topology and architecture of a collapsed backbone is a star or a rooted tree.

The main advantages of the collapsed backbone approach are

1. ease of management since the backbone is in a single location and in a single box, and
2. since the backbone is essentially the backplane or internal switching matrix of the box, proprietary, high performance technology can be used.

However, the drawback of the collapsed backbone is that if the box housing the backbone is down or there are reachability problems to the central location, the entire network will crash. These problems can be minimized by having redundant backbone boxes as well as having secondary/backup backbone locations.

== Parallel backbone ==
There are a few different types of backbones that are used for an enterprise-wide network. When organizations are looking for a very strong and trustworthy backbone, they should choose a parallel backbone. This backbone is a variation of a collapsed backbone in that it uses a central node (connection point). A parallel backbone allows for duplicate connections when there is more than one router or switch. Each switch and router is connected by two cables. By having more than one cable connecting each device, it ensures network connectivity to any area of the enterprise-wide network.

Parallel backbones are more expensive than other backbone networks because they require more cabling than the other network topologies. Although this can be a major factor when deciding which enterprise-wide topology to use, the expense makes up for the efficiency it creates by adding increased performance and fault tolerance. Most organizations use parallel backbones when there are critical devices on the network. For example, if there is important data, such as payroll, that should be accessed at all times by multiple departments, then your organization should choose to implement a parallel backbone to make sure that the connectivity is never lost.

== Serial backbone ==
A serial backbone is the simplest kind of backbone network. Serial backbones consist of two or more internetworking devices connected to each other by a single cable in a daisy-chain fashion. A daisy chain is a group of connectivity devices linked together in a serial fashion. Hubs are often connected in this way to extend a network. However, hubs are not the only device that can be connected in a serial backbone. Gateways, routers, switches and bridges more commonly form part of the backbone. The serial backbone topology could be used for enterprise-wide networks, though it is rarely implemented for that purpose.

== See also ==
- Backhaul
- Core router
- Network service provider
