= Call screening =

Process of evaluating telephone calls

Call screening is the process of evaluating the characteristics of a telephone call before deciding how or whether to answer it. It is also known as call whisper.

Some methods may include:

- listening to the message being recorded on an answering machine or voice mail.
- checking a caller ID display to see who or where the call is from.
- checking the time or date which a call or message was received.
- prescreening callers to a request line at a radio station or call-in talk show before they are allowed on the air

In addition, in the US and Canada, Call Screen is a calling feature offered by the telephone companies that allows a customer to establish a list of numbers; anyone calling the customer from those numbers will receive an automatic message indicating that the call is not being accepted. Another name, not usually used for marketing purposes, is "Selective Call Rejection". There are also devices such as the TeleZapper for screening telephone calls.

Android 11 have support for call screening with STIR/SHAKEN.
