= Wykrecnumer.pl =

Polish website

- Available in: Polish
- Owner: InterCom Telecommunications Ltd
- Current status: Shut down

Wykrecnumer.pl (Dialanumber.pl) was a Polish website that allowed its users to substitute any phone number for their own when making phone calls or sending text messages.

It was shut down when the Internal Security Agency deemed it a threat to national security and its owner was arrested on suspicion of cyberterrorism.
