= Call completion =

Call completion is a telephony feature allowing some form of alternative interaction between parties who cannot converse directly with each other. There are several possible factors which can prevent a telephone call from connecting successfully:

- Called party does not answer
- Called party is busy in another call
- Called party is off-line or unavailable
- Called party declines the call
- Called party blocked the calling party

There are various definitions as to what exactly constitutes call completion. Generally speaking, call completion may encompass the following services:

- Voicemail
- Call transfer
- Call waiting
- Messaging (e.g. SMS, IM)
- Presence notification
- Call queueing
- Automatic redial
- Text to speech interaction

The rationale for providing these features is that allowing some sort of communication between parties unable to talk directly serves both the interests of the callers (allowing them to exchange information despite the inability to talk) as well as the telecommunication operators, as the service allows them to get some return for providing the resources for the call (whereas if the caller simply hangs up, the operators basically have provided the call resources with no return).

Call completion features can be implemented on a private branch exchange (PBX) (e.g. call hold or call transfer), on a dedicated server (e.g. a voicemail server) or directly on the client device (e.g. messaging applications).

There are several commercial companies which provide call completion features, as well as IETF documents specifying call completion features for open standards, such as Session Initiation Protocol (SIP).

== See also ==
- Call termination
