= Precise tone plan =

Signalling specification for telephony

The precise tone plan is a signaling specification for the public switched telephone network (PSTN) in North America. It defines the call-progress tones used for indicating the status and progress of telephone calls to subscribers and operators.

All signals in the specification use combination (by addition) of audible tones of four frequencies: 350 Hz, 440 Hz, 480 Hz, and 620 Hz. Equipment is required to maintain tolerances within ± 0.5% in frequency and ±1.5 dB in amplitude stability. Harmonic distortion is to be at least 30 dB below the applied tone level.

The tones are as follows:

- Dial tone is a continuous tone of the addition of the frequencies 350 and 440 Hz at a level of −13 dBm.
- Audible ringing tone is defined as comprising frequencies of 440 and 480 Hz at a level of −19 dBm and a cadence of 2 seconds ON and 4 seconds OFF.
- Low tone, also busy tone, is defined as having frequency components of 480 and 620 Hz at a level of −24 dBm and a cadence of one half second ON and one half second OFF. Reorder tone, also often called fast busy tone, is the same tone, but with a cadence of 0.25 of a second ON and 0.25 of a second OFF. The original plan had two slightly different versions of this signal, with a cadence of 0.2 of a second ON and 0.3 of a second OFF to signal toll-circuit congestion and a cadence of 0.3 of second ON and 0.2 of a second OFF for local reorder.
- High tone is a tone of 480 Hz at –17 dB.

Prior to the precise tone plan, parts of the Bell System and various switching systems used various similar signal frequencies and levels, without standardization, often referred to as nonprecise call progress tones. The standardization process began with the installation of the first electronic switching system, a Western Electric 1ESS at Succasunna, NJ in 1965. All subsequent switching systems, such the 2/2B ESS, 4ESS, 5ESS, DMS-10, DMS-100, TOPS, EWSD, and NEAX-61E followed this practice.
