= Beep (sound) =

1000 Hz high pitch sound

A beep is a short, single tone, typically high-pitched, generally made by a computer or other machine. The term has its origin in onomatopoeia. The word "beep-beep" is recorded for the noise of a car horn in 1929, and the modern usage of "beep" for a high-pitched tone is attributed to Arthur C. Clarke in 1951.

== Use in computers ==
In some computer terminals, the ASCII character code 7, bell character, outputs an audible beep. The beep is also sometimes used to notify the user when the BIOS is not working or there is some other error during the start up process, often during the power-on self-test (POST). A beep is also made when holding down too many keys at the same time, as the computer often cannot handle the processes.

beep (sound)
- Developers: Various open-source and commercial developers
- Operating system: ReactOS, PTS-DOS, SISNE plus, AROS, MSX-DOS
- Type: Command

The command-line interfaces of the ReactOS, PTS-DOS, SISNE plus, and AROS operating systems include a beep command. A beep command is also part of ASCII's MSX-DOS2 Tools for MSX-DOS version 2.

== Use in transport vehicles ==
Beeps are used as a warning sound when a car, truck, bus, tractor or locomotive) is moving in reverse. "Beep" is commonly used as a noun to refer to the sound produced by a car horn. The term is also used as a verb to refer to the action of honking a car horn at someone (e.g., "Why did that guy beep at me?"). It is more likely to be used for higher-pitched horns, whereas the word "honk" is more likely to be used if the sound is lower-pitched (e.g. Volkswagen Beetles beep, but Oldsmobiles honk). On trains, beeps may be used for communications between members of staff.

== Use in telecommunication ==
Zip tone
Audible telephony alert which indicates an incoming call. 440 Hz 5 ms.

=== Call waiting ===
A beep is also a colloquialism for a zip tone to indicate a telephone call coming in on the same phone line as someone is currently speaking, either on a landline or mobile phone. The call waiting feature often outputs an audible "beep" noise to indicate that there is a second call coming in.

=== Paging ===
The electronic pager is often referred to as a "beeper" for the sound it emits to alert its owner to an incoming message.

=== Call back request ===
As a noun, the practice of "beeping" in sub-Saharan Africa refers to the cell phone phenomenon during which a person dials a number but immediately cancels the call before it is answered in order to elicit a call back from the recipient. One reason for this practice is to elicit a recipient to call back when the caller has almost run out of prepaid units for his/her cell phone but still wants or needs to talk to the recipient. In Rwanda, this practice has evolved into an art for courting between men and women, where women "beep" males in order to elicit a call back, which manifests the man's interest and willingness to pay for the woman's call. At times, this practice can be an inconvenience for the recipient, and at times, people ignore the "beeps." "Beeping" is also known as "flashing" in sub Saharan Africa, and is known as "menacing" or "fishing" in Indonesia.

== Censorship ==
The use of profanity and offensive language on free-to-air broadcasts in the United Kingdom, Canada, the United States, Australia, New Zealand, Hong Kong, Thailand, and Japan is sometimes censored by replacing the profane word or phrase with an audible beep(s), often accompanied by obscuring the speaker's mouth to prevent lip-reading. If there is a closed captioning, the word is commonly replaced by asterisks, used as a mixture of letters and asterisks, or "[bleep]" is used.

== See also ==
- Beep, beep (sound)
- Buzzer
