= Disconnect tone =

Type of call-progress tone

Reproduction of an iOS phone disconnect tone (not the original audio)

A disconnect tone in telephony is a tone provided to the remaining party to a call after the remote party hangs up. Typically, the disconnect tone is a few cycles of the reorder, busy, or the off-hook tone (e.g. in US), or between five and fifteen seconds of the Number Unobtainable tone (e.g. in UK).

On some telephone exchanges in the UK, the following audio message is looped for fifteen seconds, interspersed with special information tones (SIT), to advise the remote party has hung up: "(SIT) The other person has hung up". On iPhones, the tone is 3 bursts of 425 Hz tones each lasting 0.2 seconds.

== See also ==
- Forward disconnect
