= Wireless mobility management =

Wireless mobility management in Personal Communications Service (PCS) is the assigning and controlling of wireless links for terminal computer network connections. Wireless mobility management provides an alerting function for call completion to a wireless terminal, monitors wireless link performance to determine when an automatic link transfer is required, and coordinates link transfers between wireless access interfaces.

One use of this is wireless push technology, by pushing data across wireless networks, this coordinates the link transfers and pushes data between the backend and wireless device only when an established connection is found.
