= Permanent signal =

Permanent signal (PS) in American telephony terminology, or permanent loop in British usage, is a condition in which a POTS line is off-hook without connection for an extended period of time. This is indicated in modern switches by the silent termination after the off-hook tone times out and the telephone exchange computer puts the telephone line on its High & Wet list or Wetlist. In older switches, however, a Permanent Signal Holding Trunk (PSHT) would play either an off-hook tone (howler tone) or a 480/500 Hz high tone (which would subsequently bleed into adjacent lines via crosstalk). Off-hook tone is a tone of increasing intensity that is intended to alert telephone users to the fact that the receiver has been left off the hook without being connected in a call. On some systems before the off-hook tone is played, an intercept message may be announced. The most common message reads as follows; "If you'd like to make a call, please hang up and try again. If you need help, hang up and then dial your operator."

Permanent signal can also describe the state of a trunk that is seized but has not been dialed upon, if it remains in a busy condition (sometimes alerting with reorder).

In most mid-20th-century switching equipment, a permanent signal would tie up a junctor circuit, diminishing the ability of the switch to handle outgoing calls. When flooded cables or other conditions made this a real problem, switch staff would open the cable, or paper the off-normal contacts of the crossbar switch, or block the line relay from operating. These methods had the disadvantage of blocking all outgoing calls from that line until it was manually cleared. Manufacturers also sold devices that monitored the talk wires and held up the cutoff relay or crossbar hold magnet until the condition cleared. Some crossbar line circuit designs had a park condition allowing the line circuit itself to monitor the line.

Stored program control exchanges finally solved the problem, by setting a bit mask in the scanning program and running a low priority periodic checking program against the wetlist. Depending on software version, a wetlisted line may also be in PLO or lockout state.
