= Automatic redial =

Telephone service feature

Sound of a telephone call made with the automatic redial

In telecommunications, an automatic redial or last number redial is a service feature that allows the user to dial, by depressing a single key or a few keys, the most recent telephone number dialed at that instrument.

Automatic redial is often associated with the telephone instrument but may be provided by a PBX or by the central office.

Often one must subscribe to a caller ID for use of this function on a landline.

== See also ==
- Autodialer
