= Geographic number =

Type of telephone number

A geographic number is a telephone number whose digits, or a part of them, represent a geographic area related to the telephone service or the place where the termination of the telephone service occurs. National numbering plans list the ranges and geographic areas where such numbers can be assigned.

Geographic numbers are typically linked to landline telecommunications services, and their meaning and regulation differ among countries. For instance, Ofcom considers UK geographic numbers as numbers whose initial digits are 01 and 02 while ComReg's Irish numbering plan considers geographic numbers to be telephone numbers that are associated with a specific geographical location.

Geographic numbers are included in national telephone numbering plans and managed by national regulatory agencies. These are the authorities that decide on number ranges, area codes and conditions under which geographic numbers can be allocated and used. Number portability may also apply to geographic numbers, meaning that a subscriber's number will not be changed if the subscriber changes service providers.

== See also ==
- Telephone number
- Telephone numbering plan
- List of country calling codes
- Caller ID
