= Dial tone =

Signal indicating that a call is possible

A dial tone (dialling tone in the UK) is a telephony signal sent by a telephone exchange or private branch exchange (PBX) to a terminating device, such as a telephone, when an off-hook condition is detected. It indicates that the exchange is working and is ready to initiate a telephone call. The tone stops when the first dialed digit is recognized. If no digits are forthcoming, the partial dial procedure is invoked, often eliciting a special information tone and an intercept message, followed by the off-hook tone, requiring the caller to hang up and redial.

== History ==
Example of a North American dial tone
Listen to a dial tone from North America of 350 Hz + 440 Hz.

Example of a British dial tone
Listen to a dial tone from the United Kingdom of 350 Hz + 450 Hz.

Example of a current European dial tone
Listen to a European dial tone of 425 Hz

Example of a French dial tone
Listen to a French dial tone of 440 Hz

Example of a Japanese dial tone
Listen to a Japanese dial tone of 400 Hz

Early telephone exchanges signaled the switchboard operator when a subscriber picked up the telephone handset to make a call. The operator answered requesting the destination of the call. When manual exchanges were replaced with automated switching systems, the exchange generated a tone to the caller when the telephone set was picked up, indicating that the system was ready to accept dialed digits. Each digit was transmitted as it was dialed which caused the switching system to select the desired destination circuit. Modern electronic telephones may store the digits as they are entered, and only switch off-hook to complete the dialing when the subscriber presses a button.

Invented by engineer August Kruckow, the dial tone was first used in 1908 in Hildesheim, Germany.

The Bell Telephone Manufacturing Company (BTMC) in Antwerp, Belgium, Western Electric's international subsidiary, first introduced a dial tone as a standard facility with the cutover of the 7A Rotary Automatic Machine Switching System at Darlington, England, on 10 October 1914. Dial tone was an essential feature, because the 7A Rotary system was a common control switching system. It used the dial tone to indicate to the user that the switching system was ready to accept digits.

In the United States, the dial tone was introduced in the 1920s. By the time President Dwight D. Eisenhower retired in 1961 it was nearly universal, but the president himself had never encountered a dial tone. When he picked up his own household phone, his assistant had to explain what the strange noise was, as well as show Eisenhower how to use a rotary dial phone.

Before modern electronic telephone switching systems came into use, dial tones were usually generated by electromechanical devices such as motor–generators or vibrators. In the United States, the standard "city" dial tone was a 600 Hz tone that was amplitude-modulated at 120 Hz. Some dial tones were simply adapted from 60 Hz AC line current. In the UK, the standard Post Office dialing tone was 33 Hz; it was generated by a motor-driven ringing machine in most exchanges and by a vibrating-reed generator in the smaller ones. Some later ringing machines also generated a 50 Hz dial tone.

The modern dial tone varies between countries. The Precise Tone Plan for the North American Numbering Plan of the US, Canada, and various Caribbean nations specifies a combination of two tones (350 Hz and 440 Hz) which, when mixed, creates a beat frequency of 90 Hz. The British dial tone is similar, but combines 350 Hz and 450 Hz tones instead, creating a 100 Hz beat frequency. Most of Europe, as well as much of Latin America and Africa, uses a constant single tone of 425 Hz. France currently uses a single 440 Hz tone and Japan uses a single 400 Hz tone.

Cellular telephone services do not generate dial tones as no connection is made until the entire number has been specified and transmitted.

Although based on different technology, many VoIP phones provide a dial tone when the handset is lifted or speakerphone is activated. The dial tone doesn't originate from a central exchange, but is played from a recording stored in the phone's software. It is provided to indicate, especially to users familiar with older phone technology, that the phone is functioning and ready for the user to place a call.

== Variants ==
=== Second dial tone ===
In many countries a second dial tone was generated if the user dialled an area code (as opposed to a local number), indicating that the remote exchange was ready to receive digits. This was not necessary where the originating exchange had a register large enough to store both an area code and a subscriber number. The electronic exchanges of the later 20th century all had such registers, but since there were often still some electromechanical exchanges in rural areas, the second dial tone was generally only phased out in the 1990s or early 2000s when all exchanges became digital. The second dial tone would usually be different, for example somewhat higher, than the initial dial tone.

Private branch exchanges (PBXs) or key telephone systems also play a dial tone to station users. It may be the same type as used by the public switched telephone network (PSTN), or it may be a different tone to remind users to dial a prefix or select an outside line by some other method.

=== Secondary dial tone ===
A secondary dial tone is a dial tone–like sound presented to the caller after a call has been set up to prompt for additional digits to be dialed. Secondary dial tones are often used in call queuing and call forwarding systems.

=== Stutter dial tone ===
A stutter dial tone is a rapidly interrupted tone used to indicate special service conditions. It may serve as a message-waiting indicator for voice mail, or indicate that a calling feature, such as call forwarding has been activated.

=== Soft dial tones ===
A soft dial tone or express dial tone may be used when no actual service is active on a line, and normal calls cannot be made. It is maintained only so that an attached phone can dial the emergency telephone number (such as 911, 112 or 999), in compliance with the law in most places. It can sometimes also call the business office of the local exchange carrier which owns or last leased the line, such as via 6-1-1. Other functions such as ringback or ANAC may also be accessed by technicians in order to facilitate installation or activation.

== See also ==
- Ringback tone
- Busy signal
