= TeleZapper =

The TeleZapper is a device designed to reduce the number of telemarketing-related phone calls a household receives by imitating the tone signal normally played by a phone company to indicate a line has been disconnected. The Telezapper was created by Privacy Technologies.

== Background ==
Telemarketing companies typically use predictive dialers to place many calls simultaneously. When the equipment detects that someone has answered one of the many calls it has made, it quickly transfers that call to an available agent. Unanswered calls, or numbers that are disconnected, are not transferred to agents and the call is terminated automatically.

In this way, the agent is spared the time of dialing a call and waiting for an answer, and can simply speak to waiting calls that have been already set up. Additionally, if a number is determined to be disconnected, the equipment will usually mark that number as such and will not dial it again or as often.

== How it works ==
The TeleZapper is an appliance that plugs into a consumer telephone line. On detecting a ring and answer of any phone on the line, the Telezapper will immediately play a sequence of Special information tones or "SIT": one of eight internationally standardized signals that indicate a call cannot be completed. Typically the "Intercept" or "IC" SIT is used, indicating the number called has been disconnected or changed.

IC SIT
Intercept tone played by The TeleZapper (2 times)

By playing this tone signal on the line, a predictive dialer calling the household would hear it, assume the number was disconnected, terminate the call and likely mark the number as "disconnected" in its database.

This "tricking" of the telemarketer's equipment was effectively highlighted in marketing material for the TeleZapper as a way to get revenge on the "obnoxious telemarketers". The device is powered by a CR2032 battery, which is not documented in the manual and is replaced by opening the unit.

== Limitations of the TeleZapper ==
A predictive dialer merely checks for three conditions:

- A SIT signal, as described above,
- a short response, like "hello", in which case it puts the called person through to a salesperson, and
- a long response, such as an answering machine message, in which case it hangs up and re-queues the number to call back later or leaves a sales message.

Some telemarketing firms have turned off the SIT tone detector altogether in response to the TeleZapper trick, rendering it wholly ineffective.

Another limitation is that the device does not work well with voice mail systems. This is because voice mail reroutes the call from a physical line to the voice mail service without the phone ever picking up.
