= Ringback tone =

Tone indicating that a called phone is ringing

In telephony, a ringback tone (also ringback, ringing tone, or audible ringing) is a call progress tone heard by the calling party during a telephone call which indicates the called telephone is ringing. It typically consists of a repeating tone with a cadence resembling the ringing signal. In some systems, a ringback tone may be replaced with customized audio, such as music, sound effects, announcements, or advertising.

== Purpose and description ==
When a telephone call is made, its progress is indicated audibly by call progress tones. For example, if congestion or unavailable circuits prevent the call from being completed, the caller may hear a reorder tone, also called a congestion tone or all-circuits-busy tone. If the called station is already in use, the caller normally hears a busy signal. When routing is successful, the called telephone receives a ringing signal, causing it to ring or otherwise alert the called party to the incoming call. During this interval, the calling party hears a ringback tone, indicating that the called party is being alerted.

Ringback tone typically consists of repeated bursts of tone with a cadence often synchronized with the ringing signal.

The ringback tone was historically generated by the switching system serving the called party. In networks using Signalling System No. 7 (SS7), however, it is typically generated by the switching system serving the calling party, with the audio connection established upon answer.

=== Ring forward and ring back ===
Ring-forward and ring-back controls on a Bell System Traffic Service Position. The controls allowed an operator to apply ringing toward either end of a connection.

Despite the similarity in terminology, ringback tone should not be confused with ring back (sometimes written ringback) in traditional telephone signaling.

In North American telephone terminology the terms ring forward and ring back describe signaling in either direction on an established connection. A ring forward signal is sent toward the called end, while a ring back signal is sent toward the calling end.

Ring back signalling was often used by telephone operators when the originating caller had prematurely hung up and needed to be recalled for some reason such as delivery of a time & charge request, to advise that additional charges were owed on a coin paid call, or that a requested party had come on the line in a person-to-person call.

== National characteristics ==
European, Asian, and Latin American ringback tone
A European, Asian, and Latin American ringback tone per ETSI standard

French ringback tone
A French ringback tone

=== ETSI ===
Many European countries comply with European Telecommunications Standards Institute (ETSI) guidelines. Therefore, almost all ringback tones have a frequency of 425 Hz. France uses a slight variation with a higher pitch 440 Hz tone and a cadence of one second of tone followed by three to five seconds of silence.

Many Asian, African and Latin American countries also use tones that follow or take inspiration from the ETSI recommendations. Almost all of these tones have a frequency of 425 Hz. China also uses a version of the European tone, but often pitched at 450 Hz.

The ETSI tone is also part of GSM mobile standards and can be generated by handsets to indicate ringing, and is frequently used on VoIP and PBX equipment, particularly of European origin.

Variations of this tone have been used since the introduction of automatic switching in Europe in the early 20th century. Older electromechanical equipment used various frequencies and slightly different cadences.

=== Bell System tones ===
North American ringback tone
Audible ringback tone from North America

In North America (excluding Mexico, Central America and parts of the Caribbean), the standard audible ringback tone is a repeated cadence of a two-second tone and four seconds of silence. In Korea, repeated cadence of a one-second tone and two seconds of silence. The signal is composed of the frequencies 440 Hz and 480 Hz.

This ringback tone is also commonly used on VoIP and PBX systems.

=== General Post Office tones ===
UK, Ireland, New Zealand, and Singapore audible ringback tone
A ringback tone from the United Kingdom, Ireland, New Zealand, and Singapore

Australian ringback tone
Australia audible ringback tone

The United Kingdom, Ireland, Australia, New Zealand, Hong Kong, and other countries with historical links to British General Post Office (GPO) standards, use a double ring. In many cases, the cadence consists of a double ring of 0.4 seconds separated by 0.2 seconds, and a two second pause after which the cadence repeats (0.4s on, 0.2 s off, 0.4 s on, 2 s off). In many cases the tone is a combination of 400 Hz and 450 Hz sine waves. This more precise tone was adopted in Britain and Ireland when digital switching was introduced in 1980-1981. It was also adopted in New Zealand.

Australia uses up to three different combinations of frequencies. The example shown is created by mixing 400, 425, and 450 Hz sine waves.

Hong Kong uses the North American 440 Hz and 480 Hz tone, with a slightly different cadence, using a 3-second pause between the double rings.

Malaysian ringback tone

A single 425 Hz tone is used in Malaysia.

Variations are also found in private office PABX and VoIP systems.

Historically, pre-digital systems used the same ringing cadence, but used several different tones depending on the type of equipment in use.

There is no single standard for this double-beat tone, rather countries that were influenced by British GPO standards in the early 20th century adopted similar ringing signals in their automatic switching equipment.

While many of these countries are members of the Commonwealth some, notably Ireland, are not and the Commonwealth has no role in the development of technical standards. Some of its members have never used this tone. Canada for example has always used the North American tone plan and several other members use European ringback tones modelled on ETSI or ITU guidelines.

Many countries also do not use the full British tone plan. Several use ETSI tones for busy, reorder etc, alongside a UK type ring.

=== Japan ===
Japanese ringback tone

In Japan, the standard audible ringback tone is a repeating one-second tone with a two-second pause between. The tone has a frequency of 400 ± 20 Hz, and the amplitude modulation is 15 to 20 Hz.

=== India ===
In India, the ringback tone is called caller ringback tone (CRBT), which varies with different network operators.

== Personalized ringback tones ==
Some telecommunication carriers have offered a service called of ringback tones, which play a song of the subscriber's choice in lieu of the standard ringback tone.

Patents for personalized ringback tone delivery systems were first filed in Korea by Kang-seok Kim (10-1999-0005344) in October 1999 and in the United States by Mark Gregorek et al. (U.S. patent 5,321,740), and Neil Sleevi (U.S. patent 4,811,382). The first functional ringback tone replacement system was invented by Karl Seelig (U.S. patents 7,006,608 and 7,227,929). In 2001, Seelig's prototype was described in the Orange County Register and the Economist Magazine. Onmobile Global Ltd. India filed a patent entitled Method and system for customizing ringback tone in an inter-operator telecommunication system on Nov, 18 2010.

The first US national carrier offering this service was Verizon Wireless in 2004. Because of low sales, AT&T stopped offering ringback tones in 2014.

=== Ringback music ===
Also known as caller tunes in some countries, such as India, ringback music is a service offered by mobile network operators that allows subscribers to select a melody, music, tone, song or even personalized recorded sounds as a Ring-Back tone for all of their callers. In China, users can even select a music video to be played over ViLTE (which is not supported on iPhone).

=== Ringback advertising ===
Ringback tone advertising (AdRBT) was introduced using a range of models in several commercial markets in 2008. In America, Ring Plus offered the first interactive advertisement platform. In Turkey, 4play Digital Workshop launched 'TonlaKazaan' AdRBT with Turkcell, and Xipto AdRBT launched in the United States with Cincinnati Bell wireless; OnMobile launched an Ad-supported Music RBT program in India with Vodafone. 4Play Digital workshop accumulated several hundred thousand users of their service in the first few months of commercial deployment, and received an innovation award in February 2009 at the Mobile World Congress in Barcelona. AdRBT typically rewards the caller or the called party with discounted Music RBT service, free minutes, cash, or other rewards in return for accepting advertising messages integrated with Music Ringback, or for selecting advertisements instead of music as a personalized advertising ringback.

In May 2011, Adfortel started the first ad-sponsored calling service in Austria with Orange, with users hearing a targeted advertisement instead of the regular waiting ring tone.

=== Interactive reverse ringback tone ===
Interactive reverse ringback tones (IRRBT) are the same as normal ringback tones but have interactive functionalities and are targeted to the person who configures the tone. IRRBTs are heard on the telephone line by the caller who sets the IRRBT while the phone they are calling is ringing.

Unlike the RBT, the IRRBT is often generated in the nearest switch and transmitted in-band, so the IRRBT will take precedence if both are configured.

Social network ringback tones provide interactive social network content to subscribers. Mixcess is the first platform (social network) using IRRBTs in the United States. The IRRBT was developed by Ring Plus, Inc. (U.S. Patent No. 7,227,929 invented by Karl Seelig, et al.). The IRRBT can be used to share videos, music and messages from friends.

== See also ==
- Ringtone
- Dial tone
- Busy signal
- Off-hook tone
- Reorder tone
