= Zip tone =

Type of call-progress tone

Zip tone
Audible telephony alert which indicates an incoming call. 440 Hz 5 ms.

In telephony, a zip tone (also known as a whisper tone or call waiting tone) is a call-progress tone which indicates a new incoming call is either connecting or waiting depending on the application. Unlike a ringtone, which alerts those near a telephone to answer it, a zip tone alerts someone already on the line—for example a telephone operator, call center agent, or telephone subscriber with call waiting service—that action is needed for an incoming call such as pressing a button or reciting a phrase (e.g. "May I help you?"). This way of offering an incoming call to an available call center agent is also referred to as 'call forcing' or 'forced calling'.

== Tone composition and customization ==
The tone is typically a single, short burst (e.g. 440 hertz for 5 milliseconds) but can also be customized with multiple bursts or tones to hint at the nature of the call, so the agent can answer the call with the appropriate greeting; or a subscriber may know that a specific caller is calling or number was dialed (see distinctive ring).

In some automatic call distribution applications, the standard tone can be completely replaced with a digital recording of the agent speaking the answer phrase, thereby relieving them of the need to constantly repeat it, alerting the agent of an incoming call, and answering the call more quickly from the perspective of the caller.

== See also ==
- Automatic Call Distribution
- Call waiting
- TSPS
- Telephone
