= Call transfer =

A call transfer is a telecommunications mechanism that enables a user to relocate an existing telephone call to another phone or attendant console, using a transfer button or a switchhook flash and dialing the required location. The transferred call is either announced or unannounced.

If the transferred call is announced, the desired party/extension is notified of the impending transfer. This is typically done by putting the caller on hold and dialing the desired party/extension; they are then notified and, if they choose to accept the call, it is transferred over to them. Other terms commonly used for an announced transfer include "attended", "consult", "full-consult", "supervised" and "conference" transfer.

On the other hand, an unannounced transfer is self-explanatory: it is transferred without notifying the desired party/extension of the impending call. It is simply transferred to their line by way of a "transfer" key on the operator's phone or by keying in a string of digits which achieves the same function. Other terms commonly used for an unannounced transfer include "unsupervised" and "blind". Unsupervised call transfer can be either warm or cold - depending on the moment when B-leg is disconnected. See also Call forwarding

== Types of call transfers ==
In the Call Center space, the following types of call transfers can be undertaken and take on a slightly different meaning:

- Warm transfer: (also known as a live or hot transfer) the call center operator dials a number and talks to the person who has picked up the call before transferring the caller over to them. This could also be a three-way conference before the call center operator drops-off. One common example of a warm transfer is when a receptionist or virtual receptionist takes a call for the business and notifies the party attempting to be reached who the person is and the nature of their call.
- Tepid transfer: This involves the call center operator dialing a number and transferring the caller on to the called number without conferencing or speaking to the third party. Tepid transfer usually applies when a transfer is being made to a number where queue management has been implemented in some capacity (multiple lines or hunt groups, IVR, voicemail, callback facility etc.)
- Cold transfer: This transfer is in reality not a transfer, but a pass-on of information for the caller to call a particular number after they hang up the current call. However, in certain instances a cold transfer may be implemented by calling the desired number on behalf of the caller, the original call handler/operator then drops-off without waiting for the called number to be picked up, whether or not the dialed number had queue management implemented or not.
