= Intercept message =

Telephone message stating a call cannot be completed

An intercept message is a telephone recording informing the caller that the call cannot be completed, for any of a number of reasons ranging from local congestion, to disconnection of the destination phone, number dial errors or network trouble along the route.

== Background ==
Before automation, calls to a disconnected or non-working number would be diverted to an intercept operator. The operator would ask what number the subscriber was attempting to call, determine the reason for the intercept and relay the information to the calling party.

The first automatic intercept systems used rotating magnetic drums containing multiple recorded phrases, with a computer or mechanical control system playing phrases in the proper sequence. Initially, the caller was given the option to remain on the line for a live operator after the announcement was completed; this has since been removed.

These messages are generally performed by female voices, although male voices are used as well.

Jane Barbe, Pat Fleet, and Joyce Gordon are well known for being the voices behind many intercept messages originating in the United States.

Many of these recordings end with the phrase "This is a recording" to let the callers know that they have not reached a live operator.

=== No Such Number ===
In some cases, attempts to call a non-working number would give the "No Such Number" tone, also known as the "crybaby" tone. Bearing resemblance to a siren, it played continuously after an invalid digit was dialed, effectively stopping the call before it could be processed. This tone was introduced by Bell Systems in 1941, and was intended to sound distinct from other telephone signalling used at the time. According to a document from Bell Labs, customers would confuse previous tones intended for this purpose with others already in use, necessitating the need for a more distinctive tone.

== Message wording ==
The precise wording of intercept messages is left to the discretion of each local telephone company, except that most such messages nowadays start with one of several special information tones, standardized by Telcordia when it was still called Bellcore.

In the 1970s, for example, New York Telephone used the following:

I'm sorry; the number you have reached is not in service, or temporarily disconnected. The number you have reached is not in service at this time. This is a recording.

Bell of Pennsylvania used the following:

I'm sorry, the number you have reached is not in service. Please check the number in your directory and dial again ... the number you have reached is not in service ... if you remain on the line, an operator will answer ... thank you, this is a recording.

In rural areas, the name of the town from which the exchange service is furnished was often included in the message; this was especially true if the telephone company providing the service was not part of the Bell System.

=== Generic message adopted ===
Telephone intercept recording by Jane Barbe for the Bell Telephone System in the United States

By the 1980s, a standardized generic message was adopted, and is in use in a vast majority of localities in America today. It reads as follows:

We're sorry; you have reached a number that has been disconnected or is no longer in service. If you feel you have reached this recording in error, please check the number and try your call again.

=== Customized message ===
The option also exists to replace the generic message with a customized message, as applicable, such as in cases where a subscriber's telephone number has changed, usually due to relocation. This service is known in America as Number Referral Service, and in Britain as Ceased Number Intercept. An example of a Number Referral Service intercept message is:

The number you have reached, old number, has been changed. The new number is new number. Please make note of this change.

== Message triggers ==
=== Cancelled service ===
When a customer moves and cancels their telephone service, an intercept message is often used even if no new number has replaced the old one.

The number you have reached, old number, has been disconnected. No further information is available about old number.

A similar intercept occurs if a number has recently been unlisted; no new number is provided:

The number you have reached, old number, has been changed to a non-published number.

In the past, the call would be forwarded to an intercept operator after usually two readings of the message; today, however, this procedure is not observed, and on some systems a fast busy signal follows the second reading of the message instead. (A busy or an Off-Hook may be used depending on the provider.)

=== Incorrect number dialed ===
A different intercept message is used when the caller has dialed a number the first three digits of which have not yet been assigned within that area code. This message, too, formerly varied by locality; the following was used in New York City in the 1960s:

If you are calling a number outside New York City, please dial the area code and the local number. If you are dialing a New York City number, please check the number and dial again. This is a recording. If you need assistance, please call your operator.

The standard version of this message in use today is the following. This is used when the three-digit exchange does not exist in that area code.

We're sorry; we are unable to complete your call as dialed. Please check the number and dial again, or call your operator to help you.

Most of these messages start with the phrase "Your call cannot be completed as dialed." Sometimes a message would say to first dial a 1 or a 0 (the toll prefix for a trunk call) plus the area code of the called number. A message may also be played when 0 or 1 followed by an area code is prepended unnecessarily on landline phone calls to local destinations. As of 2021, area code dialing is required in multi area code areas even for local calls, making the "not necessary to dial a 1 or 0" message no longer relevant for some areas.

=== Toll-free number calling area ===
As the owner of a toll-free telephone number must pay to receive all long-distance calls (including misdialed calls), a toll-free subscriber may request that the responsible organization for a toll-free number (often but not always the inbound long-distance carrier) configure the number to only be reachable from specific area codes, from within one province or state or from specified cities. (The original Bell System InWATS used wide multiple-state or province "bands" as calling areas; modern systems route more finely.)

An example of a message for this reason reads:

We're sorry, you have dialed a number which cannot be reached from your calling area.

In Canada, this message is translated:

Le numéro que vous avez composé n'est pas disponible de votre région.

The announcement is repeated, then followed by a numeric identifier.

=== Network congestion ===
AT&T has an intercept message that is heard due to network congestion: "All circuits are busy now, please try your call again [TANDEM]". The number and digits at the end identify the network edge or Tandem switch the caller's local exchange company routed the call to. There is also a network message heard when an attempt to route a call to a nodal or ISDN T1 on the terminating end fails due to no call set-up signal from the PBX being received by the far-end Tandem or edge switch "Your call did not go through, [TANDEM]". The tandem IDs are formatted like this: [3 digit number]T for main tandems [AREA-CODE]-[NUMBER]L for edge tandems.

Optus has an intercept message which is heard by Optus customers when the network is congested or when a technical fault prevents customers from making phone calls: "Unfortunately due to temporary service difficulties, we are unable to connect your call at this time. Please try again later". After the message is played, the call will disconnect.

=== Phone left off-hook ===
If a phone receiver is left off-hook, some phone systems may use an intercept message to inform callers to hang up their phone receivers. The most common message reads as follows:

If you'd like to make a call, please hang up and try again. If you need help, hang up and then dial your operator.

A formerly-used variation of this message was as follows:

"This is a recording. Please hang up. There appears to be a receiver off the hook. Please check your main telephone and extensions, then try your call again. Thank you."

The message may be repeated, then followed by a loud, rasping off-hook tone intended to remain audible even if the handset is on the desktop instead of at the subscriber's ear. This tone is louder than the standard busy/fast busy signal.

=== In Australia ===
In Australia, a user is often given the following message signifying that a call could not be connected. It is voiced by Anna Hruby, who is known as "The Telstra Lady" for her distinctive and memorable voice. This only applies to the Telstra Network; however, Optus and other networks have similar messages, each voiced by a different individual.

- Telstra: "Your call could not be connected; please check the number and try again." and "The number you have called is not connected, please check the number before calling again."
- Optus: "Optus wishes to advise that the number you have dialed was incomplete or incorrect. Please check the number and dial again."
- Vodafone AU: "You've mis-dialled a number; your call will not be connected. If you want emergency services, please dial Triple Zero."

The message is usually then followed by a series of letters and numbers signifying the local access switch associated with the caller's exchange or the receiving party's exchange.

== Variations and enhancements ==
In almost any case, a telephone switch may be programmed to return a slow or fast busy signal instead of an intercept message. Intercept messages also often end with a coded identifier signifying which switch the message is being played by; this can be useful for diagnosing network problems.
