= Busy signal =

Type of call-progress tone

Example of a North American, Hong Kong, South Korean and the Philippines’ busy signal
Listen to a busy signal from North America, Hong Kong, South Korea and the Philippines.

Example of an old North American busy signal
Listen to a busy signal from North America used prior to 1980.

Example of a European, Indonesian, Macau, and Latin American busy signal
Listen to a busy signal from Europe.

Example of a French busy signal
Listen to a busy signal from France.

Example of a United Kingdom busy signal
Listen to a busy signal from the United Kingdom.

A busy signal (or busy tone or engaged tone) in telephony is an audible call-progress tone or audible signal to the calling party that indicates failure to complete the requested connection of that particular telephone call.

The busy signal has become less common in the past few decades due to the prevalence of call waiting and voicemail.

== Reasons for a busy signal ==
An otherwise unspecified busy signal indicates that the called number is occupied:

- The called number is talking with another caller on the phone
- The number is calling out
- Someone else has called the number or is calling the number at the same time
- The other line was left off-hook
- It is otherwise unavailable

The standard busy signal sometimes occurs (sometimes with an intercept message played over the busy) at the end of a call to indicate the other party has hung up (see Disconnect tone), but mostly the off-hook tone is used. In some phone companies in the United Kingdom, the busy signal is played after the dial tone to indicate the caller has used up their allocated time to dial a number and must hang up, before the off-hook tone is played.

== The "beep line" ==
In the mid 1950s through the early 1980s, a telephone busy signal provided an early form of social media in many cities and towns of the United States, colloquially known as the "beep line" or "jam line". Due to a flaw in the telephone switching equipment, teenagers discovered they could talk to each other over the busy signal, often exchanging phone numbers, mostly for the purpose of dating. Common phone numbers for this to form were on popular radio station request lines, where teens would be calling in en masse to try to win concert tickets or request their favorite songs, thus "jamming the lines" and generating a perpetual busy signal.

== Reorder tone ==
A reorder tone, sometimes called a fast busy signal, indicates that no transmission path to the called number is available. This can occur either because the Inter-LATA trunk is busy at the time of the call- in which case this clears in a few seconds, if one redials- or the number is temporarily out of service, due to maintenance or the number is not willing to accept calls. It is otherwise played after a recorded announcement explaining the reason for a general call failure.

== Styles ==
Countries have different signaling tones that act as busy signals, in most cases consisting of a tone with equal on/off periods at a rate of between 60 and 120 interruptions per minute (i.p.m.).

In North America, the Precise Tone Plan used today employs two tones of 480 and 620 Hz at an amplitude of -24 dBm with a 0.5 s on/off cadence. Prior to the adoption of the PreciseTone system, the busy signal generally had the same frequency as the dial tone. Until frequencies began to be standardized in the 1960s, telephone signals varied from telephone exchange to exchange.

The European Telecommunications Standards Institute (ETSI) recommendation for busy tone is a 425 Hz tone at -20dBm in a 0.5 s on/off cadence. This sequence was already in use in Portugal, Spain, The Netherlands, (West-)Germany, Italy, Greece, Switzerland, Lichtenstein, Iceland, Norway, Andorra, Monaco, San Marino, and Vatican City prior to publication of the ETSI recommendation.

The ETSI recommendation is now followed by all countries of the European Union. Historical oddities within the EU are:

- Ireland follows the ETSI recommendation for the busy tone, but the ringback tone is the same as that used in the UK.
- A few networks in France continue to use a 440 Hz/0.5 s sequence in place of the ETSI recommended 425 Hz/0.5 s sequence, but this is gradually being replaced.

The ETSI recommendation is also the default (i.e. non-localized) busy tone generated by mobile phones that follow the GSM & 3GPP family of standards.

The ETSI recommendation is also followed by some ISDN equipment and PBX/office systems found outside Europe.

Most countries of the former Soviet Union, including Russia, are not members of the ETSI. These former Soviet republics employ a 425 Hz busy tone with a 0.4 s on/off cadence.

In the United Kingdom, the busy tone is a single 400 Hz tone with equal 0.375 s on/off periods. This was the case even when the UK was still part of the EU. The current 400 Hz/375ms tone was adopted in the mid-to-late 1960s and replaced the older busy tone, which was the same 400 Hz signal but at half the pulse duration, 0.75 s on, 0.75 s off.

== See also ==
- Call-progress tone
- Federal Standard 1037C
- MIL-STD-188
- Special information tone, e.g. "all network circuits busy"
