= Call waiting =

Telephone service feature

Zip tone
Audible tone which indicates an incoming call. 440 Hz 5 ms.

Call waiting is a telephone service where a subscriber can accept a second incoming telephone call by placing an in-progress call on hold, and may also switch between calls. With some providers it can be combined with additional features such as conferencing, call forwarding, and caller ID. Call waiting is intended to alleviate the need to have more than one telephone line or number for voice communications.

When a second call arrives, the subscriber is notified with a beep or tone. The user may then either switch to the new call or continue the existing conversation. The service is commonly used in both personal and business contexts, allowing individuals to manage multiple calls without a second phone line, and enabling small businesses to handle client calls without advanced call management systems.

== History ==
Call waiting was introduced to North America in the early 1970s when the first generation of electronic switch machines built by Western Electric, Electronic Signaling System 1 started to replace older mechanical equipment in the old Bell System local telephone companies. At first, some smaller municipalities were able to offer customers call waiting only on a specific phone exchange (e.g., phone customers in Trenton, Michigan initially had to have a phone number starting with 671 to have call waiting, since 671 was at that time the only exchange in that area served by one of the new ESS switches), but as demand for it became more widespread, it eventually became available on all phone exchanges as the older equipment was phased out.

In Europe, call waiting was also introduced in the 1970s with the introduction of the first digital switching systems such as the Ericsson AXE, Alcatel E10 and System 12. It was also available on some Ericsson crossbar exchanges, such as the ARE11 which, while electromechanical, was also computerised. Other digital systems such as the UK's System X also supported the service. Switching systems developed in the 1980s such as the German Siemens/Bosch EWSD also had call waiting.

== Star codes ==
In North America, the NANP uses the *70 star code prefix to suspend call waiting for a dialed call. A stutter dial tone confirms the de-activation.

On most European telephone networks, and GSM or UMTS mobile phones, call waiting is activated by dialing the following codes:

- To activate: *43#
- To deactivate: #43#
- To check status: *#43#

A voice announcement, tone or a message on your phone's screen will confirm the service status.

Call waiting in Europe uses an "R" (recall) button on the phone. This performs a similar function to a North American hook flash button but is much shorter duration, typically 80ms to 100ms, vs. 250ms in North America. In some networks, pressing R toggles between the calls, similar to North America. However, in most countries there are further options:

- R1 – Answer the waiting call and hang up on the current call.
- R2 – Toggle between the calls.
- R3 – Merge the two calls for conference calling.
- R0 – Reject call waiting – This will send the call to voice mail or a busy tone.

Type II Caller ID also works with call waiting.

== Line sharing ==
Since the waiting call uses a zip tone (for example, a 440 Hz beep every ten seconds in North America), call waiting can cause dial-up Internet access connections to terminate, unless the modem supports the most recent V.92 modem standard. For this reason, call waiting is often disabled on shared voice lines used for dial-up modem or fax purposes. However, Call Waiting has no impact on DSL connections.

== Call waiting deluxe ==
Call waiting deluxe is the Bellcore (now Telcordia Technologies) term for Type II caller ID with Disposition Options.

This CLASS-based POTS-telephone calling feature works by combining the services of call waiting with caller ID but also introduces an "options" feature that, in conjunction with certain screen-based telephones, or other capable equipment, gives a telephone user the option to:

- Switch: Place the current call on hold to take the second call (not a new feature)
- Hang-up: Disconnect the current call and take the second call
- Please Hold: Send the caller either a custom or telephone-company-generated voice message asking the caller to hold
- Forward to Voice Mail: Send the incoming caller to the recipient’s voice mail service.
- Join: Add the incoming caller to the existing conversation.

== See also ==
- Vertical service code
- Zip tone
- Analog Display Services Interface
