= Off-hook tone =

Audible alert on a telephone left off-hook

The off-hook tone (also off-hook warning, howling tone, or howler tone) is a telephony signal for alerting a user that the telephone has been left off-hook without use for an extended period, effectively disabling the telephone line.

== North America ==
The off-hook tone in exchanges of the North American Numbering Plan consists of a superposition of tones with the frequencies 1400 Hz, 2060 Hz, 2450 Hz, and 2600 Hz, played at a cadence of 100 ms on and 100 ms off. The signal is applied to the local loop by the switching system for permanent signal treatment to alert an end user (subscriber) of an off-hook condition of the telephone set, i.e. that the telephone handset should be placed on-hook.

Before playing the signal, a certain timeout has to elapse, and on some systems an intercept message is announced (e.g. "If you'd like to make a call, please hang up and try again. If you need help, hang up and then dial your operator. This is a recording.").

A single burst of off-hook tone is sometimes used to indicate to a party that the call is being transferred, notably at 1-800-BELL-SOUTH (800-235-5768).

Example of a North American Off-hook tone
Listen to an off-hook tone from North America.

High Tone
Listen to an older 480Hz off-hook tone.

Some central office switches in the United States, notably older GTD-5 EAX systems, utilize a single frequency tone, 480 Hz, known as High Tone for this purpose. In either case, the tone is substantially louder than any other signal transmitted over a copper POTS circuit; loud enough to be heard across a room from an unused off-hook telephone.

== Howler ==
In the United Kingdom, a warbling signal sounding rather like an alarm siren is played at steadily increasing volume to a telephone left off-hook and unused on telephone lines provided by the BT Group and many PABX extensions. It is sometimes referred to as a howler.

In some cases it is composed of the DTMF tones * and # played alternately.

Telephone lines provided by NTL/Virgin Media tend to use the American-style tones, including a recorded message.
