= Reorder tone =

Audible signal indicating the call cannot be processed

Example of a North American reorder tone
Listen to a reorder tone from North America.

Example of a European reorder tone
Listen to a reorder tone from Europe.

Example of a British reorder tone
Listen to a reorder tone from the United Kingdom.

The reorder tone, also known as the fast busy tone, or the congestion tone, or all trunks busy (ATB) tone is an audible call-progress tone in the public switched telephone network (PSTN) that is returned to a calling party to indicate that the call cannot be processed through the network.

The tone characteristics vary by country or telephone administrations. In North America it is a dual-frequency tone of 620 Hz and 480 Hz interrupted 120 times per minute at a cadence of 0.25 seconds on, 0.25 off, i.e., two beeps per second.

In EU countries and those following ETSI (European Telecommunication Standards Institute) recommendations, the cadence is the same as North America, i.e. 0.25 seconds on / 0.25 seconds off, but with a 425 Hz tone.

The UK reorder tone uses a 400 Hz tone with a cadence of 0.4 seconds on, 0.35 seconds off, 0.225 seconds on, 0.525 seconds off. In some instances the Number Unobtainable Tone may be used instead. This is a continuous, uninterrupted 400 Hz tone.

The signal is used to indicate that the destination is unreachable, either because all circuits (trunks) are busy, the called number is out of service, the call is unroutable, or sometimes that an invalid code has been dialed. A PBX also often indicates an invalid extension, while dialing an invalid telephone number on the PSTN usually results in playing the triple special information tone and a recorded announcement.

Some European networks may return the reorder tone as a generic error signal for invalid or incorrect numbers or where a particular call type is not supported or has been barred.

Some switches, notably in Europe where open dial plans are used, analyse a number as it's dialled, and may even return a reorder tone before the complete number is dialled if the initial sequence of digits are invalid.

The reorder tone is sometimes confused with the busy signal because they use the same frequencies and differ only in that the busy signal's beeping sounds have a slower cadence than those of the reorder tone.
