= Conference call =

Telephone call with several participants

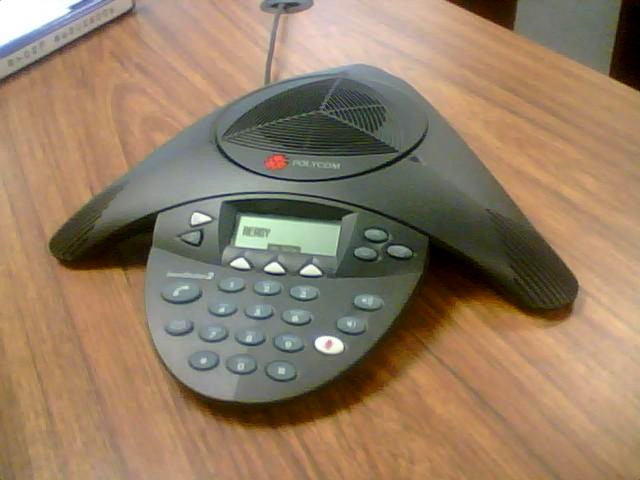
A Polycom phone made specifically for conference calls.

A conference call (sometimes called an audio teleconference or ATC) is a telephone call in which several people share a telephone line at the same time. The conference call may be designed to allow the called party to participate during the call or set up so that the called party merely listens into the call and cannot speak.

The more limited three-way calling is available (usually at an extra charge) on home or office phone lines. For a three-way call, a normal point to point phone call is established between two parties. Then one of the parties tells the other party that they will add a third party. This party then presses the hook flash button (or recall button), and immediately dials the third party. While it is ringing, this party presses the flash/recall again to connect the three parties together. This option allows callers to add a second outgoing call to an already connected call. Three-way calling does not require any additional conference server and all mixing is handled within the endpoints, as there is no need to create separate mixes for each party or prioritise speakers when there are only three parties.

== Features ==
Conference calls can be designed so that the calling party calls the other participants and adds them to the call; however, participants are usually able to call into the conference call themselves by dialing a telephone number that connects to a "conference bridge," which is a specialized type of equipment that links telephone lines.

Companies commonly use a specialized service provider who maintains the conference bridge, or who provides the phone numbers and PIN codes that participants dial to access the meeting or conference call. These service providers can often dial-out to participants, connecting them to call and introducing them to the parties who are on-the-line. The operators can also take additional information such as question and answer details and also enable and disable advanced conferencing features such as muting lines, muting participants and enabling a recording feature. An operator can often be summoned to conference call hosted by a service provider using a combination of keys on a users' (sometimes only the moderator) telephone keypad. The most common recall function is *0. (asterisk and the zero/operator key)

== Usage ==
Businesses use conference calls daily to meet with remote parties, both internally and outside of their company. Common applications are client meetings or sales presentations, project meetings and updates, regular team meetings, training classes and communication to employees who work in different locations. Conference calling is viewed as a primary means of cutting travel costs and allowing workers to be more productive by not having to go out-of-office for meetings.

Conference calls are used by nearly all public corporations in the United States to report their quarterly results. These calls usually allow for questions from stock analysts and are called earnings calls. A standard conference call begins with a disclaimer stating that anything said in the duration of the call may be a forward-looking statement, and that results may vary significantly. The CEO, CFO, or investor relations officer then will read the company's quarterly report. Lastly, the call is opened for questions from analysts.

Conference calls are increasingly used in conjunction with web conferences, where presentations or documents are shared via the internet. This allows people on the call to view content such as corporate reports, sales figures and company data presented by one of the participants. The main benefit is that the presenter of the document can give clear explanations about details within the document, while others simultaneously view the presentation. Care should be taken not to mix video and audio source on the same network since the video feed can cause interruptions on sound quality.

Business conference calls are usually hosted or operator-assisted, with a variety of features.

Conference calls are also beginning to cross over into the world of podcasting and social networking, which in turn fosters new kinds of interaction patterns. Live streaming or broadcasting of conference calls allows a larger audience access to the call without dialing into a bridge. In addition, organizers of conference calls can publish a dial-in number alongside the audio stream, creating potential for audience members to dial in and interact.

== Legislation ==
In November 2011, the Federal Communications Commission (FCC) published a 732-page Order on InterCarrier Compensation (ICC), including rules governing revenue sharing. Citing Section 251(b)(5) of the Telecommunications Act of 1996, the FCC mandated that terminating access rates for all calls (not just conference calls) be leveled in 2012 and 2013, then reduced in three increments over the subsequent three years until they reached $0 in 2017. These mostly sub-1 cent charges are replaced with an access recovery charge (ARC) that is added onto every customers' bill by their phone carriers. In other words, every phone company will get to keep the terminating access charges they had to pay out to connect each call while charging consumers more whether they make calls or not. This order has been challenged at the Federal Appeals Court by several parties.

As for revenue sharing, the order adds a measure for high volume call traffic which triggers an immediate terminating access charge reduction to the lowest rate of any carrier in that state.

In the United Kingdom, the 0870 prefix was originally used by UK-based free conference calling providers in order to receive a rebate from every call from a telephone company that owns the number. However, in April 2009 Ofcom, the independent regulator and competition authority for the UK communications industries, announced that the rebate that is payable to the telecom's supplier when an 0870 number is used would be removed. Systems were soon moved to 0844 and 0871 prefixes in order to retain the revenue sharing arrangement, this means that whilst you wouldn't pay the conference call provider directly, you would dial an expensive premium-rate number to access your conference call.

Recently in the UK, a very small number of conference call providers have begun to use 03 numbers, which are included in bundled minutes under Ofcom regulations. This has provided the option to hold conference calls without any costs whatsoever, as call are included in the minutes bundles provided by most UK network operators. There is a general trend for companies in the UK to more to 03 numbers for inbound services because these numbers are more palatable to the caller.

== Costs ==
=== Flat-rate ===
Flat-rate conferencing services are being offered which give unlimited access to a conference bridge at a fixed monthly cost. Because telecommunication carriers offer free long-distance bundled with local service, this alternative is gaining widespread popularity for budget conscious businesses and non-profits.

In the UK, there are conference services offered on a pay-as-you-go basis where the cost of the phone calls (using 0843/0844, or 0871/0872 non-geographic revenue sharing numbers) from each of the participants covers the cost of the conference service. With this service type there is no monthly charge and usually no contracts to sign.

=== Prepaid ===
Prepaid conference call services allow businesses and individuals to purchase conferencing services online, and conduct conference calls on a pay-as-you-go basis. Typically, a conference call PIN and its associated calling instructions are displayed immediately online after being purchased and/or sent via email. Generally, prepaid conference call services are used with a landline telephone, mobile phone, or computer, and there is no need to buy additional expensive telecommunications hardware or add/switch long-distance service. Some services allow one to start or join a conference call from virtually any country worldwide—with appropriate telephone access.

Large telecommunications providers such as AT&T, Embarq (formerly Sprint), Verizon and other large to medium conferencing service providers maintain a dominant position in the conferencing niche; servicing many of the world's biggest brands. However, the Internet and improved global VoIP networks have helped to significantly reduce the barrier of entry into this niche.

=== Free ===
Free conferencing is different from traditional conference calling in that it has no organizer fees, no human operator, and allows for multiple people to connect at no cost other than that of any other phone call (local or toll). Companies that provide free conference call services are usually compensated through a revenue-sharing arrangement with the local phone company, sharing the termination charge for incoming calls to a phone carrier.

In the case of free conference calling, the conferencing company strikes an agreement with the local phone company that hosts the conferencing bridge (equipment connecting lines) to receive a share of the terminating access charge received for connecting the call. At large carriers such as AT&T and Verizon, they keep these access charges for their own conferencing services in addition to charging the customer for the conference service. With free conference calling, as mentioned above, there are no organizer fees so these services do not double-dip: the consumer pays for a regular call with the same three components – origination, transport, and termination – of any call. In other words, the call costs the same as any other call under the customer's calling plan, but the conferencing is included for free to the host and participants of the conference call.

A distinct difference between sound quality of paid and free conference calls has been noted by customers who have claimed to hear background noises when using the free conferencing services, which rarely happens on paid conference calling services.

=== Premium-rate ===
Here participants dial in on a premium-rate number such as a toll free number in the US. The conference is typically hosted by the party that perceives value in the call in order to justify the cost: this could be a business owner, a non-profit board member, an educator, lawyer, or expert in any given field. That person then usually pays for the cost of the call. Premium conferencing can also be used for charitable fundraisers.

Premium conferencing feature sets include:

- Reservationless or operator assisted conferencing
- Host PINs
- Name announce
- Roll-call (unique and superior)
- Moderator/participant codes
- Live web-based call management with mute/unmute, drop one/all, and dial out
- Recording with .wav file access through an online account
- High-quality on-demand transcriptions (with 4-hour turnaround on request)
- Customizable, "branded" greetings(unique)
- Broadcast mode
- Q&A facilitation
- Polling and polling reports
- Sub-conferencing
- Dial-out with or without requested response
- Web based screen sharing options
- 24/7 availability

== Standards ==
The 3rd Generation Partnership Project (3GPP) defined a technical specification (TS 24.147) for conferencing within the IP Multimedia Subsystem (IMS) based on the Session Initiation Protocol (SIP), SIP Events, the Session Description Protocol (SDP) and the Binary Floor Control Protocol (BFCP, aka RFC4582).

== See also ==
- Teleconference – Live exchange of information among several persons remote from one another
- Conference operation – Live exchange of information among several persons remote from one another
