= Special information tone =

Three-beep signal indicating a call did not go through correctly

In telephony, a special information tone (SIT) is an in-band international standard call progress tone consisting of three rising tones indicating a call has failed. It usually precedes a recorded announcement describing the problem.

Because the SIT is well known in many countries, callers can understand that their call has failed, even though they do not understand the language of the recorded announcement (e.g., when calling internationally) instead of assuming the recording is voicemail or some other intended function.

Like a dial tone or busy signal, the SIT is an in-band signal intended both to be heard by the caller, and to be detected by automated dialing equipment to determine a call has failed. In North America, the AT&T/Bellcore SIT standard allows the frequency and duration of the tones to vary slightly - making eight distinct messages specifically for automated equipment; indicating not only a failed call, but also the specific reason for the failure (e.g., disconnected number, busy circuits, dialing error, etc.). The equipment can then make an intelligent choice about what to do next. If the circuits were busy, then calling again later makes sense; if the number was disconnected, then calling again is futile.

As an alternative to the in-band SIT tone and recording, SS7 allows call progress advisories to be played/displayed to callers in their own language.

== International Telecommunication Union definition ==
A SIT, as defined by the ITU - Telecommunications Standardization Sector (ITU-T), consists of a sequence of three precise tone segments with frequencies of 950 ±50 Hz, 1400 ±50 Hz, and 1800 ±50 Hz, sent in that order.

Each segment is allowed a duration of 330 ±70 ms with a silent interval of up to 30 ms between segments. There is a silence period of 1000 ±250 ms. The nominal tone level is -24 dBm0 (decibels relative to 1 mW measured at the 0 dB TLP) with limits of ±1.5 dB measured with a continuous tone.

The difference in level between any two segments is required to be less than 3 dB.

These requirements apply at the point the tones are sent on the network.

== AT&T/Bellcore standard composition ==
The AT&T SIT follows the above ITU standard but uses more tightly controlled signals within the ITU limits to signal the condition encountered. By using slight variations of tone frequencies and durations, the AT&T SIT conveys to automated equipment why the call failed. The ITU specification requires the frequency to be within ±50 Hz of a nominal value. AT&T deliberately transmits a frequency that varies from the ITU nominal; it is about 35 Hz high to signal one set of conditions or about 35 Hz low to signal another set. Similarly, AT&T also modulates the duration of the tone within the ITU limits of 330±70 ms. Using this scheme, AT&T could encode six bits of information, representing 64 different combinations; only four bits are actually used, encoding eight different conditions, with eight further combinations currently left unused.

In the Bellcore specification the first and second tone segments vary based on the condition encountered: having either a short or long duration, and either a lower or higher part of the frequency band allowed by the ITU-T. The third tone segment may be of long or short duration but is limited to the lower frequency state. Currently, the third tone segment has been assigned both a fixed long duration and a fixed lower frequency. This fixed assignment of the third tone provides a reference or calibration point for detection devices.

=== Segment durations ===
- Short duration = 276 ms
- Long duration = 380 ms

=== Frequencies ===
First segment	Second segment	Third segment
(high) 985.2 Hz	(high) 1428.5 Hz	(low) 1776.7 Hz
(low) 913.8 Hz	(low) 1370.6 Hz	(low) 1776.7 Hz

The interval between the segments of SITs is between 0 and 4 ms. To minimize the number of callers who may abandon the call without listening to the announcement, the nominal time gap between the third tone segment and the beginning of the announcement is set as close to zero as possible, with an allowed maximum of 100 ms.

== Example recordings and encoding scheme ==
The recordings below play each SIT sequence two times.

Name	Code	Duration	Frequency	Description	Example
Reorder – intraLATA	RO'	short, long, long	low, high, low	Incomplete digits, internal office or feature failure – local office	RO' SIT Reorder – intraLATA (2x)
Vacant Code	VC	long, short, long	high, low, low	Unassigned N11 code, CLASS code or prefix	VC SIT Vacant Code (2x)
No Circuit – intraLATA	NC'	long, long, long	high, high, low	All circuits busy – local office	NC' SIT No Circuit – intraLATA (2x)
Intercept	IC	short, short, long	low, low, low	Number changed or disconnected	IC SIT Intercept (2x)
Reorder – interLATA	RO' '	short, long, long	high, low, low	Call failure, no wink or partial digits received – distant office	RO' ' SIT Reorder – interLATA (2x)
No Circuit – interLATA	NC' '	long, long, long	low, low, low	All circuits busy – distant office	NC' ' SIT No Circuit – interLATA (2x)
Ineffective/Other	IO	long, short, long	low, high, low	General misdialing, coin deposit required or other failure	IO SIT Ineffective/Other (2x)
Future Use	–	short, short, long	high, high, low	Reserved for future use.	Future SIT Future Use (Not Used) (2x)

== See also ==
- Call-progress tone
- Telephone
- Pat Fleet, the voice on most U.S. intercept recordings
- TeleZapper
