= Telephone call =

Audio communication over a telephone

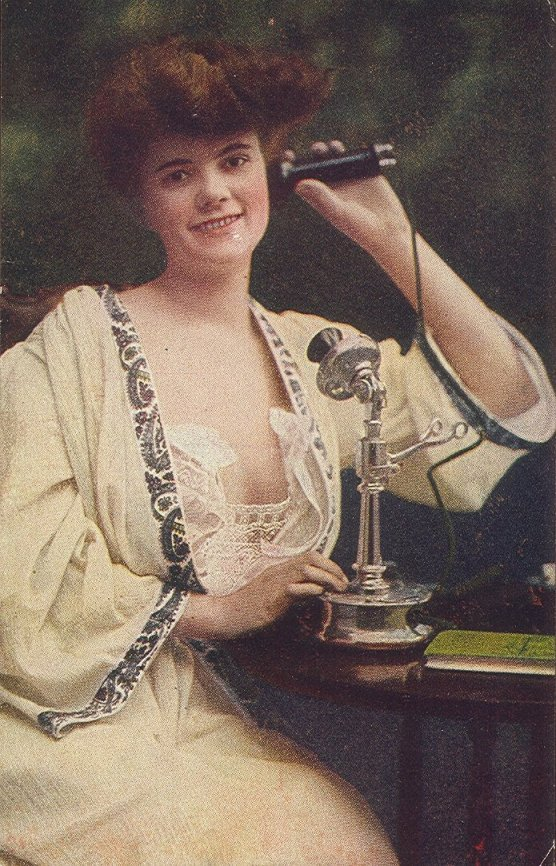
An early 20th century candlestick telephone used for a phone call

A telephone call, phone call, voice call, or simply a call, is the use of a connection over a telephone network between two parties for audio communication. To start a call, the calling party, the caller, opens a connection for a particular phone number and waits for an answer to the request, often indicated by an audible ringtone. To answer the call, the called party accepts the request to start a conversation. A party is most commonly a single person, but can be a group of people (i.e. conference call) or a machine (i.e. fax). In some contexts, the term A-Number refers to the caller and B-Number refers to the called party.

The telephone call was enabled by multiple inventions in the mid- to late-19th century including the telephone. Initial technology involved point-to-point electrical wire connections between telephone installations, until centralized exchanges evolved where telephone operators established each interconnection manually at a telephone switchboard after asking the calling party for their call destination. After the invention of automatic telephone exchanges in the 1890s, the process became increasingly automated, eventually leading to the widespread adoption of digital exchanges in the second half of the 20th century, including the transition to wireless communication via mobile telephone networks and cellular networks. With the development of the Internet, the cost of telephone calls was drastically reduced with Voice over Internet Protocol (VoIP).

== First telephone call ==
It is generally believed that the first telephone call was on March 10, 1876, when Alexander Graham Bell said, “Mr. Watson – Come here – I want to see you.” However, there are two other candidates for this credit, and which of the three candidates deserves credit depends on some details.

The first test with promising results was in June 1875 when Bell and his assistant, Thomas Watson, tested the so-called gallows telephone. Its transmitter utilized Bell’s novel concept of vibrating a magnetized part in front of a coil of wire to create an electric current according to the principle of Faraday’s law. This telephone transmitted voice-like sounds (timbre) consisting of many frequencies, and Watson declared that “The gods had arrived.” But distinct words were not heard as had been expected.

The second test with improved results was in March 1876, and that was the test in which Bell literally shouted, “Mr. Watson – Come here – I want to see you.” Although Watson claimed to have heard those words via telephone, Bell astutely tried to confirm Watson’s claim by changing rooms and having Watson read unfamiliar pages from a book. Bell then wrote “It was certainly the case that articulate sounds proceeded from S [the receiver]. The effect was loud but indistinct and muffled.” Bell further noted “As it was I could not make out the sense – but an occasional word here and there was quite distinct.” Nevertheless, with reference to those words, in 1916 Bell unveiled a plaque in Boston that reads, “Here Alexander Graham Bell transmitted to Thomas Augustus Watson the first complete and intelligible sentence by telephone March 10, 1876.”

For those tests in March 1876, Bell used a liquid transmitter that appears to be like the one designed by Elisha Gray, Bell’s competitor. It varied the resistance in a battery circuit and was nothing like Bell’s vibrating magnet design. Gray never successfully demonstrated his liquid transmitter, and it was not developed into a practical instrument. Further, Bernard Finn, whose department at the Smithsonian holds Bell’s artifacts, said that Gray’s design “was in fact worthless.”

The third test with successful results was conducted on May 22, 1876, when Edward Wilson was substituting for Watson. Using Bell’s vibrating-magnet design, Bell said “I could hear very distinctively the sounds that were uttered into A [the transmitter’s mouthpiece]. Consonants & vowels were equally intelligible. Although my ear was pressed tightly against S’ [the receiver] – I heard the sentence ‘Mr. Bell are you going to the Centennial’ with the utmost distinctiveness.” This was soon confirmed at the 1876 Centennial Exhibition by demonstrations in front of many witnesses. Further improvements were made to Bell’s vibrating magnet telephone in November 1876, and the improved design was patented and became the world’s first commercial telephone.

== Information transmission ==
A telephone call may carry ordinary voice transmission using a telephone, data transmission when the calling party and called party are using modems, or facsimile transmission when they are using fax machines. The call may use land line, mobile phone, satellite phone or any combination thereof. When a telephone call has more than one called party it is referred to as a conference call. When two or more users of the network are sharing the same physical line, it is called a party line or Rural phone line.

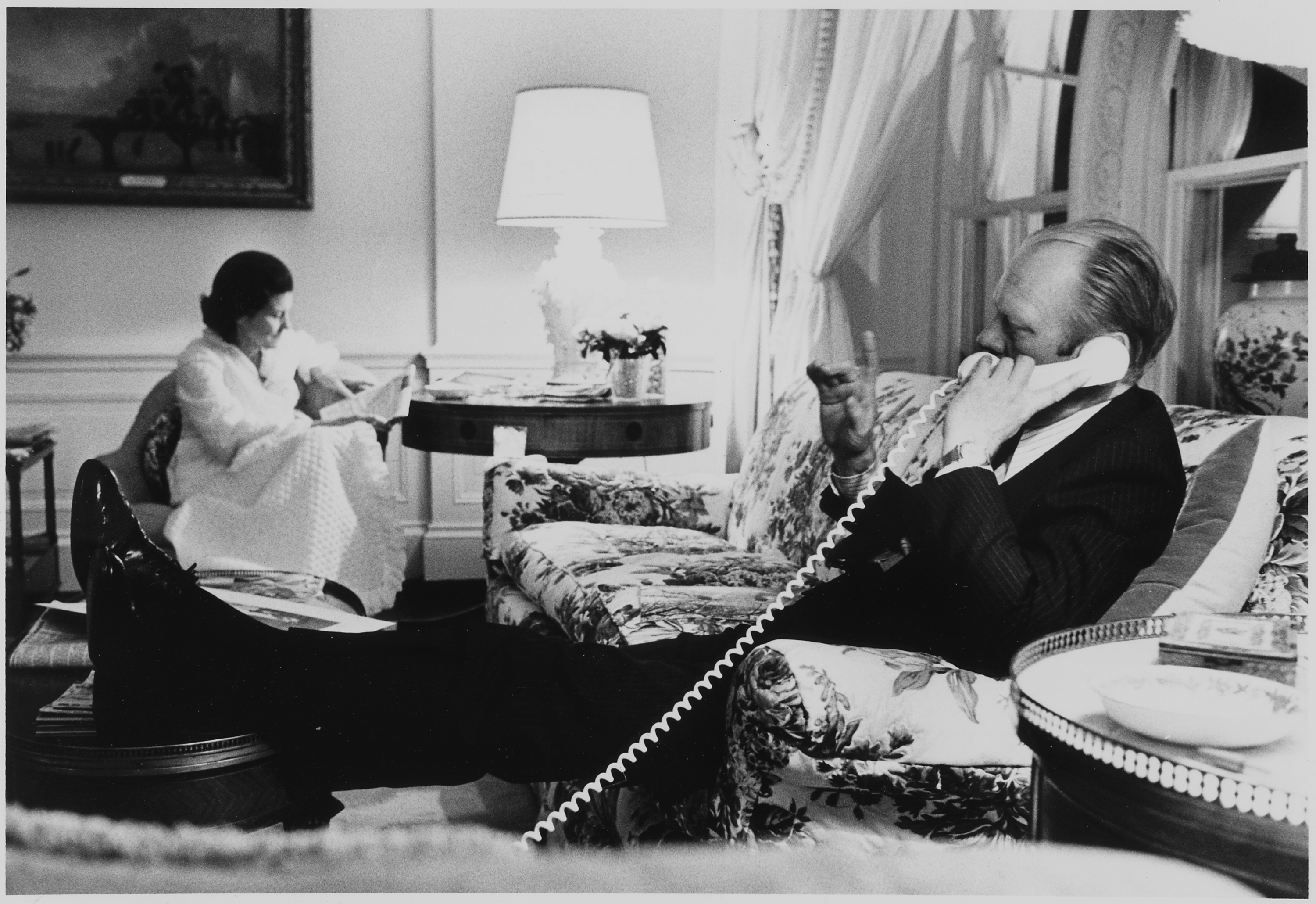
U.S. President Gerald Ford on the phone

If the caller's wired phone is connected directly to the calling party, when the caller takes their telephone off-hook, the calling party's phone will ring. This is called a [hot line] or [ringdown]. Otherwise, the calling party is usually given a tone to indicate they should begin dialing the desired number. In some (now very rare) cases, if the calling party cannot dial calls directly, they will be connected to an operator who places the call for them.

Calls may be placed through a public network, such as the public switched telephone network (PSTN), provided by a commercial telephone company or a private network, such as a private branch exchange (PBX). In most cases a private network is connected to the public network to provide PBX users with access to the larger networks. Incoming calls to a private network arrive at the PBX in two ways: either directly to a users phone using direct inward dialing or indirectly via a human or electronic receptionist who will answer the call and connect it to the desired user.

Most telephone calls through the PSTN are set up using ISUP signalling messages or one of its variants between telephone exchanges to establish the end to end connection. Calls through PBX networks are set up using QSIG, DPNSS or variants.

== Costs ==
Some types of calls are not charged, such as local calls (and internal calls) dialed directly by a telephone subscriber in Canada, the United States, Hong Kong, Ireland or New Zealand (Residential subscribers only). In most other areas, all telephone calls are charged a fee for the connection. Fees depend on the provider of the service, the type of service being used (a call placed from a landline or wired telephone will have one rate, and a call placed from a mobile telephone will have a different rate) and the distance between the calling and the called parties. In most circumstances, the calling party pays this fee. However, in some circumstances such as a reverse charge or collect call, the called party pays the cost of the call. In some circumstances, the caller pays a flat rate charge for the telephone connection and does not pay any additional charge for all calls made. Telecommunication liberalization has been established in several countries to allow customers to keep their local phone provider and use an alternate provider for a certain call in order to save money.

== Placing a call ==
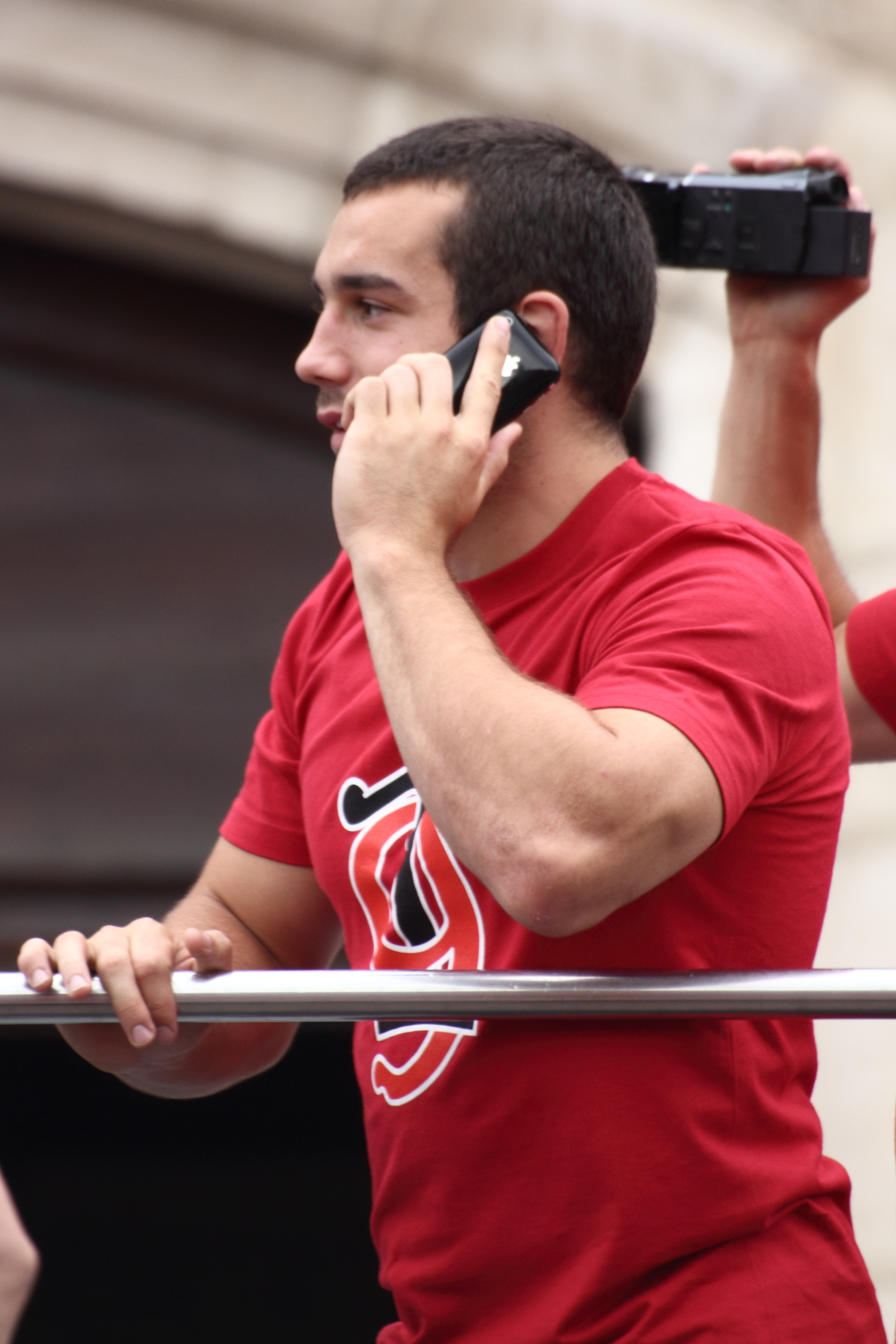
An early 21st century mobile phone being used for a phone call

A typical pre-2000s phone call using a traditional phone is placed by picking the phone handset up off the base. The caller then rotary dials or presses buttons for the phone number needed to complete the call, and the call is routed to the phone which has that number. The second phone makes a ringing noise to alert its owner. The first user can hold the handset so that the hearing end is next to their ear and the speaking end is within range of their mouth. They then hear a ringing noise in the earpiece. If the second phone is picked up, then the two users can talk to one another. If the phone is not picked up, the first user continues to hear a ringing noise until they hang up their own phone. On a mobile phone, a digital keypad will show on the screen. The caller will then press the number keys to call the specific phone number. The call will then be initiated through the phone service provider and both people will be able to talk to each other through the microphones on the device that they are using.

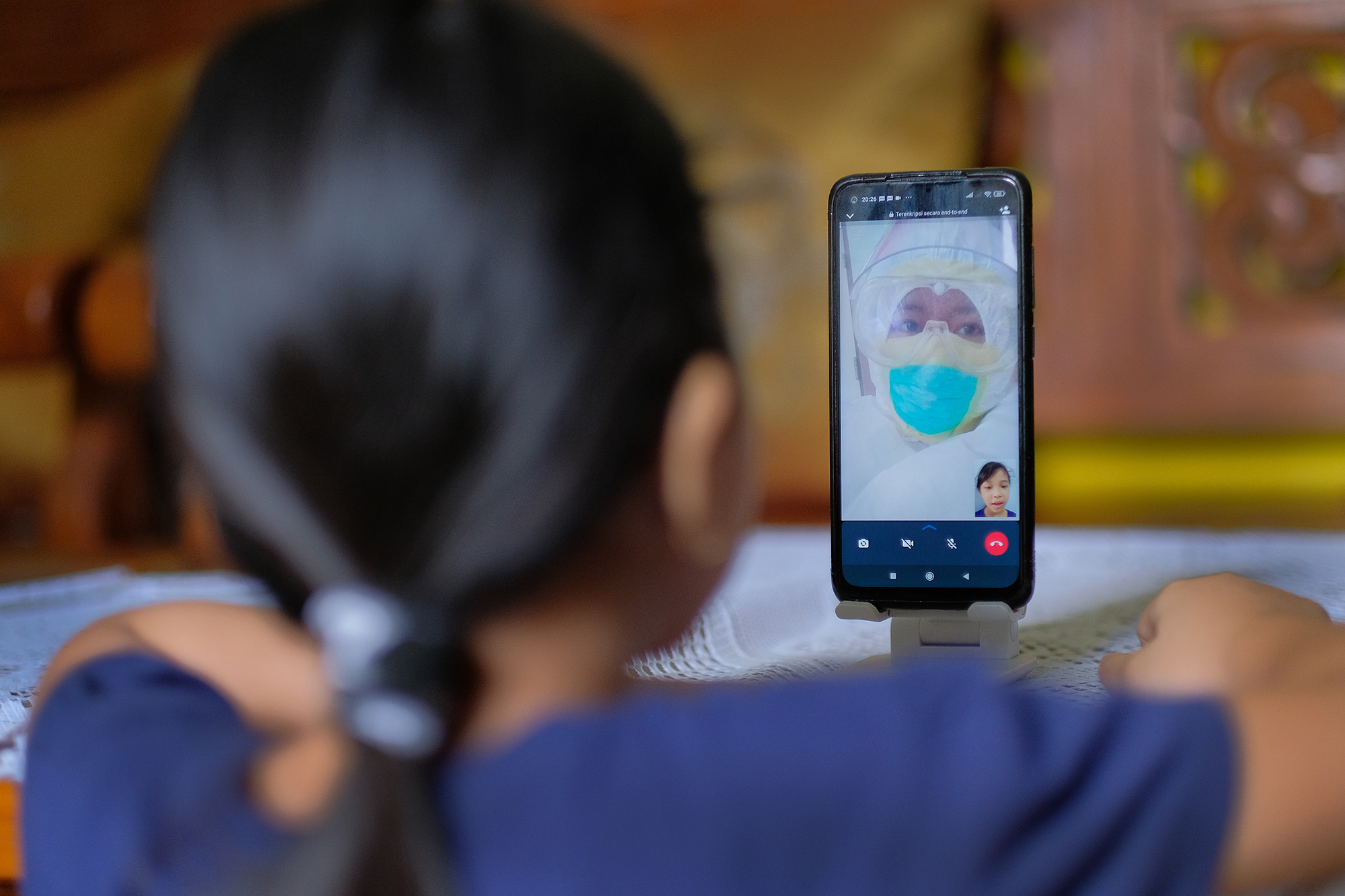
A modern Smartphone being used for a phone call

In addition to the traditional method of placing a telephone call, new technologies allow different methods for initiating a telephone call, such as voice dialing. Voice over IP technology allows calls to be made through a PC, using a service like Skype. Other services, such as toll-free dial-around, enable callers to initiate a telephone call through a third party without exchanging phone numbers. Originally, no phone calls could be made without first talking to the Switchboard operator. However for many years an operator has not been needed to complete most phone calls.

A special number can be dialed for operator assistance, which may be different for local vs. long-distance or international calls.

=== Details of operation ===
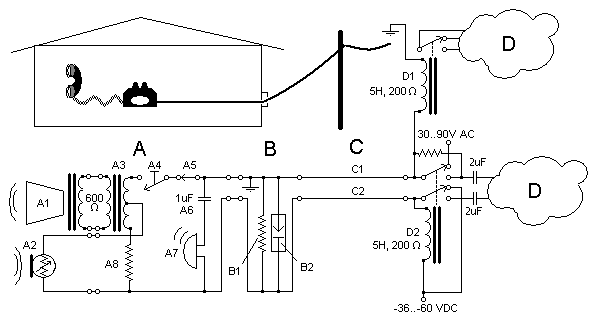
Diagram

The landline telephone contains a switchhook (A4) and an alerting device, usually a ringer (A7), that remains connected to the phone line whenever the phone is "on hook" (i.e. the switch (A4) is open), and other components which are connected when the phone is "off hook". The off-hook components include a transmitter (microphone, A2), a receiver (speaker, A1), and other circuits for dialing, filtering (A3), and amplification.

To place a telephone call, the calling party picks up the telephone's handset, thereby operating a lever that closes the hook switch (A4). This powers the telephone by connecting the transmission hybrid transformer, as well as the transmitter (microphone) and receiver (speaker) to the line. In this off-hook state, the telephone circuitry has a low resistance of typically less than 300 ohms, which causes the flow of direct current (DC) in the line (C) from the telephone exchange. The exchange detects this current, attaches a digit receiver circuit to the line, and sends dial tone to indicate its readiness. On a modern push-button telephone, the caller then presses the number keys to send the telephone number of the destination, the called party. The keys control a tone generator circuit (not shown) that sends DTMF tones to the exchange. A rotary-dial telephone uses pulse dialing (A5), sending electrical pulses, that the exchange counts to decode each digit of the telephone number. If the called party's line is available, the terminating exchange applies an intermittent alternating current (AC) ringing signal of 40 to 90 volts to alert the called party of the incoming call. If the called party's line is in use, however, the exchange returns a busy signal to the calling party. If the called party's line is in use but subscribes to call waiting service, the exchange sends an intermittent audible tone to the called party to indicate another call.

The electromechanical ringer of a telephone (A7) is connected to the line through a capacitor (A6), which blocks direct current and passes the alternating current of the ringing power. The telephone draws no current when it is on hook, while a DC voltage is continually applied to the line. Exchange circuitry (D2) can send an alternating current down the line to activate the ringer and announce an incoming call. In manual service exchange areas, before dial service was installed, telephones had hand-cranked magneto generators to generate a ringing voltage back to the exchange or any other telephone on the same line. When a landline telephone is inactive (on hook), the circuitry at the telephone exchange detects the absence of direct current to indicate that the line is not in use. When a party initiates a call to this line, the exchange sends the ringing signal. When the called party picks up the handset, they actuate a double-circuit switchhook (not shown) which may simultaneously disconnect the alerting device and connect the audio circuitry to the line. This, in turn, draws direct current through the line, confirming that the called phone is now active. The exchange circuitry turns off the ring signal, and both telephones are now active and connected through the exchange. The parties may now converse as long as both phones remain off hook. When a party hangs up, placing the handset back on the cradle or hook, direct current ceases in that line, signaling the exchange to disconnect the call.

Calls to parties beyond the local exchange are carried over trunk lines which establish connections between exchanges. In modern telephone networks, fiber-optic cable and digital technology are often employed in such connections. Satellite technology may be used for communication over very long distances.

In most landline telephones, the transmitter and receiver (microphone and speaker) are located in the handset, although in a speakerphone these components may be located in the base or in a separate enclosure. Powered by the line, the microphone (A2) produces a modulated electric current which varies its frequency and amplitude in response to the sound waves arriving at its diaphragm. The resulting current is transmitted along the telephone line to the local exchange then on to the other phone (via the local exchange or via a larger network), where it passes through the coil of the receiver (A3). The varying current in the coil produces a corresponding movement of the receiver's diaphragm, reproducing the original sound waves present at the transmitter.

Along with the microphone and speaker, additional circuitry is incorporated to prevent the incoming speaker signal and the outgoing microphone signal from interfering with each other. This is accomplished through a hybrid coil (A3). The incoming audio signal passes through a resistor (A8) and the primary winding of the coil (A3) which passes it to the speaker (A1). Since the current path A8 – A3 has a far lower impedance than the microphone (A2), virtually all of the incoming signal passes through it and bypasses the microphone.

At the same time the DC voltage across the line causes a DC current which is split between the resistor-coil (A8-A3) branch and the microphone-coil (A2-A3) branch. The DC current through the resistor-coil branch has no effect on the incoming audio signal. But the DC current passing through the microphone is turned into AC (in response to voice sounds) which then passes through only the upper branch of the coil's (A3) primary winding, which has far fewer turns than the lower primary winding. This causes a small portion of the microphone output to be fed back to the speaker, while the rest of the AC goes out through the phone line.

A lineman's handset is a telephone designed for testing the telephone network and may be attached directly to aerial lines and other infrastructure components.

== Tones ==
Preceding, during, and after a traditional telephone call is placed, certain tones signify the progress and status of the telephone call:

- a dial tone signifying that the system is ready to accept a telephone number and connect the call
- either:
  - a ringing tone signifying that the called party has yet to answer the telephone
  - a busy signal (or engaged tone) signifying that the called party's telephone is being used in a telephone call to another person (or is "off the hook" though no number has been dialled, i.e. the customer does not want to be disturbed)
  - a fast busy signal (also called reorder tone or overflow busy tone) signifying that there is congestion in the telephone network, or possibly that the calling subscriber has delayed too long in dialling all the necessary digits. The fast busy signal is generally twice as fast as the normal busy signal.
- status tones such as STD notification tones (to inform the caller that the telephone call is being trunk dialled at a greater cost to the calling party), minute minder beeps (to inform the caller of the relative duration of the telephone call on calls that are charged on a time basis), and others
- a tone (sometimes the busy signal, often the dial tone) to signify that the called party has hung up.
- tones used by earlier inband telephone switching systems were simulated by a Red box or a blue box used by "phone phreaks" to illegally make or receive free trunk/toll calls.
- off-hook tone if the phone has been picked up but no number dialed for an extended period of time.

Cell phones generally do not use dial tones, because the technology used to transmit the dialed number is different from a landline.

== Unwanted calls ==
Unsolicited telephone calls are a modern nuisance. Common kinds of unwanted calls include prank calls, telemarketing calls, and obscene phone calls.

Caller ID provides some protection against unwanted calls, but can still be turned off by the calling party. Even where end-user Caller ID is not available, calls are still logged, both in billing records at the originating telco and via automatic number identification, so the perpetrator's phone number can still be discovered in many cases. However, this does not provide complete protection: harassers can use payphones, in some cases, automatic number identification itself can be spoofed or blocked, and mobile telephone abusers can (at some cost) use "throwaway" phones or SIMs.

== Patents ==
- Rabinow, J., U.S. patent 2,813,154 - "Telephone call indicator"—November 12, 1957

== See also ==
- Call completion
- Call processing
- Call-progress tone
- Emergency telephone number
- Long-distance calling
- Pocket dialing
- Telephone phobia
- Teletraffic engineering
- Video call
