= Digital access carrier system =

Digital access carrier system (DACS) is the name used by British Telecom (BT Group plc) in the United Kingdom for a 0+2 pair gain system.

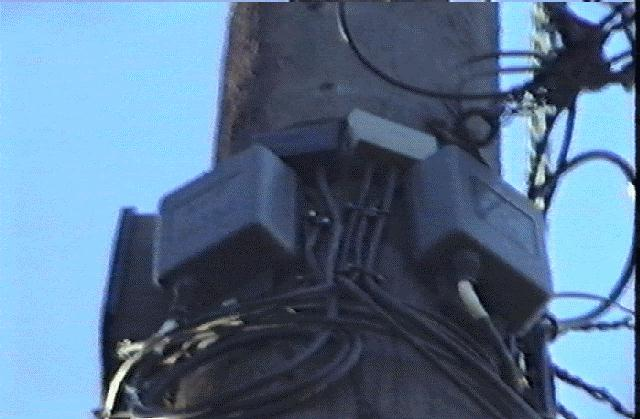
Two Telspec DACS remote units mounted on a pole

== Usage ==
For almost as long as telephones have been a common feature in homes and offices, telecommunication companies have regularly been faced with a situation where demand in a particular street or area exceeds the number of physical copper pairs available from the pole to the exchange.

Until the early 1980s, this situation was often dealt with by providing shared or 'party' lines, which were connected to multiple customers. This raised privacy problems since any subscriber connected to the line could listen to (or indeed, interrupt) another subscriber's call.

With advances in the size, price, and reliability of electronic equipment, it eventually became possible to provide two normal subscriber lines over one copper pair, eliminating the need for party lines. The more modern ISDN technology based digital systems that perform this task are known in Britain by the generic name 'DACS'.

DACS works by digitising the analogue signal and sending the combined digital information for both lines over the same copper pair between the exchange and the pole. The cost of the DACS equipment is significantly less than the cost of installing additional copper pairs.

== Overview ==
The DACS system consists of three main parts:

1. The exchange unit (EU), which connects multiple pairs of analogue lines to their corresponding single digital lines. One Telspec EU rack connects as many as 80 analogue lines over 40 digital copper pairs.
2. The copper pair between the exchange and the remote unit, carrying the digital signal between the exchange unit and the remote unit.
3. The remote unit (RU), which connects two analogue customer lines to one digital copper pair. The RUs are usually to be found on poles within a few hundred metres of the subscribers' homes or businesses.

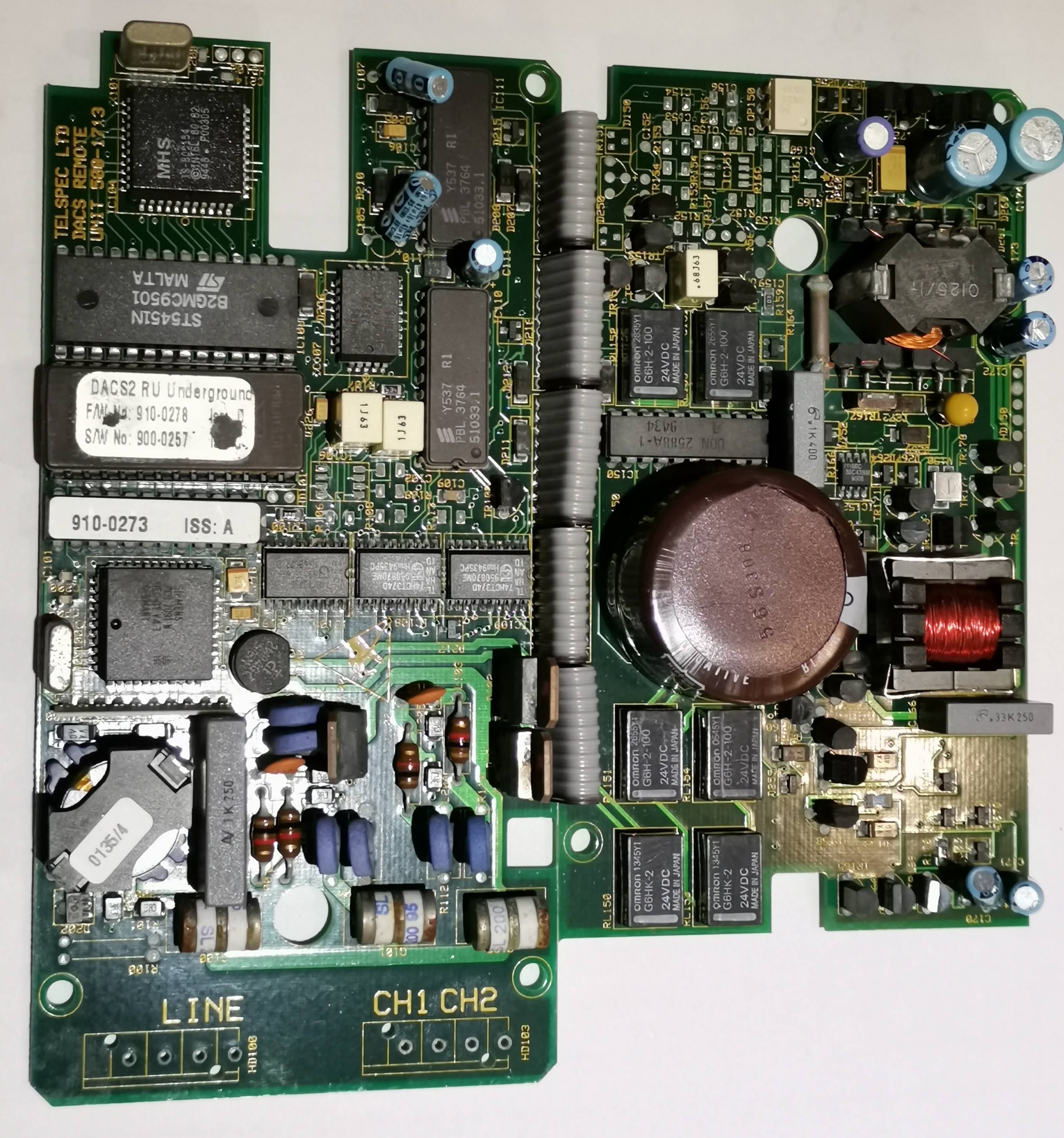
Populated DACS PCBs

== Advantages ==
1. Because it uses a digital signal along most of the distance between subscriber and exchange, DACS is less prone to electrical interference than the more usual analogue line.
2. The DACS system has built-in monitoring from the exchange. An alert is generated if the connection is lost or errors occur. This contrasts with a conventional analogue line, where the fault will usually not be known until a customer complains.

== DACS and modems ==
The 56kbit/s speed of analogue modems can only be achieved if there is a single digital to analogue conversion in the route from the ISP to the end user. Since DACS involves an additional conversion to digital, and then back to analogue, this means that the maximum possible bitrate over a DACS line is 33.6 kbit/s. Furthermore, many 56 kbit/s modems are unable to successfully negotiate even this speed over a DACS line. DSL broadband internet connections cannot work on a DACS line as they rely on a copper pair running all the way to the telephone exchange.

Since BT's traditional telephone line service is contractually only required to support voice and fax communication, BT are not obliged to remove a DACS because of problems with 56 kbit/s modems.

== Technical ==
This section contains more technical detail on the 3 main subsystems that make DACS.

1. The exchange equipment (EU), which converts 2 analogue lines to a digital trunk. One Telspec EU rack takes up to 80 analogue lines, 10 per ALC (Analogue Line Card), and produces up to 40 digital trunks, 5 per DLC card. It consists of 1 SMAC (System Maintenance and Clocks) card, up to 8 ALCs and up to 8 DLCs. The SMAC card contains, amongst other things:
  - The main 48 V to 5 V converter to supply the digital circuitry in the rack.
  - Fault mimics to present to the exchange's test equipment.
  - An analogue modem to receive data calls for remote diagnostics.
  - A battery backed real-time clock and memory to store the time and type of fault events like bit errors.
  - A 25-pin RS232 connector for local access to the SMAC card's diagnostic logs.
  - A 2-digit 7-segment display and buttons, which forms a basic MMI, for an engineer without a terminal.
  - Circuitry to generate the various clocks and pulses needed to keep the ISDN chipsets and codecs working together.
  Pulling out the SMAC card on a live fully populated rack could make all 80 subscribers' lines ring briefly.
  Again, one ECI EU rack takes up to 80 analogue lines, but has just one type of card, which supports 4 analogue lines, and 2 digital trunks and RUs.
2. The copper pair between the EU and RU, which carries the 2B1Q signalling and the 140 V DC for powering the RU and subscribers' telephones. The 140 V DC is not applied to the line until an RU is detected so that engineers do not get a shock. It is also removed as soon as the RU is disconnected, again for safety. The RU is distinguished from a phone or line fault by the 8 mA it draws when powered from a 48 V source. 8 mA was chosen because a working phone never draws a continuous 8 mA under normal line conditions. Although DACS (1 + 2) uses the same 2B1Q signalling as basic rate ISDN, there are some significant differences:
  - A DACS call travels most of the way from the subscriber to the exchange digitally, it is converted back to analogue to interface to the telephone exchange line card, i.e. ISDN has a digital interface at the exchange end and the subscriber end, DACS has an analogue interface at both the exchange end and the subscriber end.
  - ISDN and DACS use different D channel signalling.
  - DACS has up to 140 V DC on the digital telephone line as opposed to the usual ISDN voltages of 48 V or 90 V.
3. The RU, which converts the digital trunk back to two analogue trunks. The RUs are usually to be found within a few hundred metres of the subscribers' homes or businesses (either up a pole or in a manhole), unless both lines belong to the same subscriber, where the RU (internal) could be on the subscriber's premises. There are 3 basic types of Telspec RU: internal (skirting board mountable), external (pole mount) and underground (for manhole). The remote unit contains a mini test head that is capable of testing both lines between the RU and subscriber for faults. It then communicates the results back to the EU digitally, where mimics are presented to the normal exchange testing equipment. DACS2 provides on and off hook Caller ID (CLI), which means that an audio path is maintained between the exchange and subscriber even if the subscriber is on hook. Line reversals are also communicated between exchange and subscriber. Telspec and ECI RUs have been known to work from each other's EU, but different gain plans as well as subtle signalling and training differences mean a less than perfect telephone service is provided.

== Who makes it? ==
BT sourced DACS from two different companies: Telspec and ECI. Each BT region installed either one or the other; e.g. in South Wales, ECI DACS is fitted, while in Kent, Telspec DACS is used.

== Definitions ==
WB900 – an analogue radio frequency based system that did not support even low speed data communications. Installed from the early 1980s. Now rarely encountered.

DACS1 – first generation digital system that did not support CLI but supported low-speed data communication devices such as fax machines. Installed from around 1990. DACS1 is no longer used in new installations.

DACS2 – released in the mid 1990s, DACS2 was an upgrade to DACS1 with support for CLI and higher data speeds (but see below). DACS2 is fundamentally similar to DACS1 in operation.

DACS – DACS1 and DACS2 are commonly known simply as 'DACS'. Most DACS installations in the UK are now DACS2.

== How did WB900 work? ==
Before DACS, WB900 (a 1 + 1 analogue carrier system) was used. The first subscriber's phone (called the 'audio customer') would be connected as normal. The second subscriber (called the 'carrier customer') would have his phone calls modulated on to an RF carrier or Carrier wave on the same physical phone line at around 40 kHz – high enough not to be noticeable to the audio customer.

== See also ==
- Subscriber Loop Carrier
- Digital access and cross-connect system – an American system for which the initialism DACS is also used.
