= Pair gain =

In telephony, pair gain is the transmission of multiple plain old telephone service (POTS) channels over the twisted pair local loop traditionally used for a single subscriber line in telephone systems. Pair gain has the effect of creating additional subscriber lines. This is typically used as an expedient way to solve subscriber line shortages at a location by using existing wiring, instead of installing new wires from the central office to the customer premises. The term was invented in the middle 20th century by analogy with earlier use of gain to extend telephone local loops far from the telephone exchange.

A pair gain system consists of concentrators or multiplexers which combine the individual channels into a single signal that is transmitted through the existing copper cable pair. The signals are then separated into individual subscriber lines at the customer premises. The pair gain unit which performs the multiplexing can provide a second telephone connection over a single subscriber line (called an Analog Multi-Line Carrier or AML) in circumstances where a customer wants to add a new phone line for a fax machine or dial-up internet connection. A larger analog pair gain system made by Anaconda in the 1960s provided seven lines. Some pair gain units can expand the number of subscriber lines available over a single copper pair to as many as sixty. Large pair gain units are stored in serving area interfaces or metal cabinets typically resembling small apartment-sized refrigerators alongside or near roadways that overlie communications rights-of-way.

DACS (Digital Access Carrier System) is a form of pair gain used in the United Kingdom. It uses a form of time-division multiple access called ISDN.

Analog pair gain came into disfavor in the 21st century, as it is detrimental to high speed dial-up modem connections, does not support 56k and is incompatible with digital subscriber line (DSL) systems. 20th century Subscriber Loop Carrier systems had similar problems. More recent digital pair gain systems, however, restore 56k and DSL capabilities by performing the functions of a DSLAM at the pair gain device.

More recently, the term pair gain has been used to refer to any multiplex/demultiplex unit used between the central office and end users, not just equipment used with copper twisted pair.

Where digital loop carrier (called Remote Integrated Multiplexer in Australia) is installed, broadband Internet subscribers may be disappointed when informed that although initial line checks were successful, high speed connections such as ADSL are unavailable due to infrastructure issues. The problem is that pair gain lines cannot carry high speed data.

== See also ==
- Party line (telephony)
- Remote concentrator
- Subscriber loop carrier
