= Automatic number announcement circuit =

Telecommunication facility in a telephone exchange

An automatic number announcement circuit (ANAC) is a component of a central office of a telephone company that provides a service to installation and service technicians to determine the telephone number of a telephone line. The facility has a telephone number that may be called to listen to an automatic announcement that includes the caller's telephone number. The ANAC facility is useful primarily during the installation of landline telephones to quickly identify one of multiple wire pairs in a bundle or at a termination point.

== Operation ==
By connecting a test telephone set, a technician calls the local telephone number of the automatic number announcement service. This call is connected to equipment at the central office that uses automatic equipment to announce the telephone number of the line calling in. The main purpose of this system is to allow telephone company technicians to identify the telephone line they are connected to.

Automatic number announcement systems are based on automatic number identification. They are intended for use by phone company technicians, the ANAC system bypasses customer features, such as unlisted numbers, caller ID blocking, and outgoing call blocking. Installers of multi-line business services where outgoing calls from all lines display the company's main number on call display can use ANAC to identify a specific line in the system, even if CID displays every line as "line one".

Most ANAC systems are provider-specific in each wire center, while others are regional or state-/province- or area-code-wide. No official lists of ANAC numbers are published, as telephone companies guard against abuse that would interfere with availability for installers.

== Exchange prefixes for testing ==
The North American Numbering Plan reserves the exchange (central office) prefixes 958 and 959 for plant testing purposes. Code 959 with three or four additional digits is dedicated for access to office test lines in local exchange carrier and interoffice carrier central offices. The specifications define several test features for line conditions, such as quiet line and busy line, and test tones transmitted to callers. Telephone numbers are assigned for ring back to test the ringer when installing telephone sets, milliwatt tone (a number simply answers with a continuous test tone) and a loop around (which connects a call to another inbound call to the same or another test number).

ANAC services are typically installed in the 958 range, which is intended for communications between central offices. In some area codes, multiple additional prefixes may be reserved for test purposes. Many area codes reserved 999; 320 was also formerly reserved in Bell Canada territory.

Other carrier-specific North American test numbers include 555-XXXX numbers (such as 555–0311 on Rogers Communications in Canada) or vertical service codes, such as *99 on Cablevision/Optimum Voice in the United States. MCI Inc. (United States) provides ANI information by dialing 800-444-4444.

== Telephone numbers ==
Plant testing telephone numbers are carrier-specific, there is no comprehensive list of telephone numbers for ANAC services. In some communities, test numbers change relatively often. In others, a major incumbent carrier might assign a single number which provides test functions on its network across an entire numbering plan area, throughout an entire province or state, or system-wide.

Some telecommunication carriers maintain toll-free numbers for ANAC facilities. Some national toll-free numbers provide automatic number identification by speaking the telephone number of the caller, but these are not intended for use in identifying the customer's own phone number. They are used for the agent in a call center to confirm the telephone a customer is calling from, so that the customer's account information can be displayed as a "screen pop" for the next available customer service representative.

== See also ==
- Plant test number
- Ringback number
