= Unlisted number =

Telephone number that is unpublished

In telephony, an unlisted number (United States, New Zealand), ex-directory number (United Kingdom), silent number, silent line (Australia), or private number (New Zealand, and Canada) is a telephone number that, for a fee, is intentionally not listed in telephone books. Although an unpublished number is not included in the phone book, an unlisted number may be available from the phone company's information operator. When used for residential households, they're primarily for privacy concerns.

Another form of anonymity is being listed with just a first initial, for those with a relatively common family name; sometimes these listings also lack an address. No fee is charged for initially being so-listed.

== Unlisted numbers as a paid service ==
NYNEX was charging $1.95 per month in 1994; in 1976 the same service was 93 cents monthly. In 1971 The New York Times wrote that some users of this service needed it to hide from bill collectors. Silent numbers are often plant test numbers that link to specific tests or control apparatus for network maintenance staff such as ringback and automatic number announcement circuit and are generally not for public use.

In Norway,(and some other countries), the directory services in the 1970s distinguished between secret number, unlisted number and listed number with a hidden address. The first type secret number was typically used by celebrities (in this case the address was hidden as well). The second type unlisted number was not listed in the (paper based) phone book, but was listed on the directory service (a voice call to 018 in the 1970s). Listed number with a hidden address is useful for women's shelter etc., where the number needs to be listed, but where the address is to be hidden from the general public. Naturally, there are many changes when directory services became available on the Internet, but this case shows that separate user groups may have different needs to hide various parameters relating to privacy.

These unlisted numbers are made known to call recipients who have caller ID, and are captured and recorded when used to call toll-free numbers.
