= EAS =

EAS may refer to:

== Academics ==
- East Asian studies, an academic field
- Early American Studies, an academic journal
- Early Admissions Scheme (Hong Kong), a defunct university entrance program
- Escola Alegria de Saber, a network of Brazilian international schools in Japan
- École des Arts du Sénégal, in Dakar, Senegal

== Aeronautics ==
- EAS Europe Airlines, a defunct French airline
- EAS Airlines, a defunct Nigerian airline
- Equivalent airspeed
- Essential Air Service, a U.S. government program
- San Sebastián Airport, in Spain

== Government ==
- East Asia Summit, a regional diplomatic forum
- Emergency Alert System, United States' national warning system
- European External Action Service, the diplomatic service and foreign and defence ministry of the European Union
- Enterprise Estonia, abbreviated EAS in Estonian, Estonian national foundation that aims to develop Estonian economy
- Employment Agency Standards Inspectorate, United Kingdom

== Science ==
- 5-epiaristolochene synthase, an enzyme
- Eastern Analytical Symposium, an American analytical chemistry organization
- Electric acoustic stimulation
- Electrophilic aromatic substitution, an organic reaction
- European Astronomical Society
- Extensive air shower, a cosmic ray shower
- Extended area service, in telecommunications
- External anal sphincter

== Technology ==
- EAS3, a software toolkit for storing and processing binary data
- Electronic Air Suspension, a type of vehicle suspension
- Electronic article surveillance, simple radio tags used to prevent shoplifting
- Emergency Alert System, an emergency warning system in the United States
- Enterprise application software
- Exchange ActiveSync, a data synchronization protocol

== Other uses ==
- EAS (album), a 2000 album by Japanese rock band Fanatic Crisis
- EAS (nutrition brand), an American sports nutrition company
- Encyclopedia of American Studies
- End of Active Service, in the military
- European Academy of Sociology, a fellowship of sociologists
- East Side Access, a public works project in New York City
- Hellenic Defence Systems (EAS), formed by the merger in 2004 of the Greek defence companies EBO and Pyrkal
