= Ringback number =

Telecommunication facility for telephone line testing

A ringback number is a telephone number for a telephone line that automatically calls the line that the call was placed from, after the caller has hung up. The typical use of this facility is by telephone company technicians for testing a new installation or for trouble-shooting.

== Operation ==
Ringback testing is an acceptance testing procedure conducted by telephone installers to verify the quality of customer premises wiring to prevent network damage from faulty equipment or installation. The test consists of calling a reverting calling telephone number (ringback number) or a vertical service code with a standard telephone. Upon answering the call, the exchange plays a unique signal tone as a signal for the installer to hangup the telephone. The exchange then places a reverting call to the originating line, causing the telephone to ring. When answered, the exchange plays a verification tone. The verification tone is issued so that telephone subscribers cannot easily use the ringback system as an intercom between multiple stations in a residence on the same line by taking the stations off-hook.

Ringback numbers are typically not listed or communicated to subscribers.

== Coin telephones ==
Narcotics trafficking and other criminal activity can use payphones to conduct crimes anonymously, so many payphones are not equipped with a ringer at all, or a quiet "chirper" solid state speaker and designated "No Incoming Calls". All payphones in the United States must be assigned a telephone number in order to make calls, some can ring or chirp if that number is called. Many customer-owned coin-operated telephones (COCOT) answer the phone at first ring with a built in modem which can be accessed by technicians to report conditions and program function parameters, one programmable function is the number of rings until the modem answers, another is whether to impose an additional charge for incoming calls or even accept no incoming calls at all. Where a payphone does not have any number listed on the unit, the number can be discovered from that phone by calling an automatic number announcement circuit (ANAC) service or a telephone with caller ID. TelCo owned payphones are generally on dedicated payphone lines which respond to special tones and Custom Local Area Signaling Services codes such as *5055 for ringback.

== Examples ==
Some ringback numbers are local or regional in scope, while others are larger in scope. Every telephone company determines its own ringback numbers for each individual central office. Under the North American Numbering Plan, most North American area codes reserve telephone numbers beginning with 958 and 959 for internal testing. Some companies also reserve 999 for test exchanges. Numbers within these test exchange block ranges are used for various types of local and long-distance testing; generally, this block includes a ringback number (to test the ringer when installing telephone sets) and a loop around (which connects a call to another inbound call to the same or another test number). Ringback numbers may appear in the 958 exchange, but there is no requirement that they reside there.

Some large telephone companies have toll-free numbers set up for ringback. In most cases, these numbers remain undisclosed to prevent abuse. Some companies change their ringback number every month to maintain secrecy. Some carriers (such as Bell Canada) have been known to disable all payphone calls to 958 or 959 test lines.

4101 was formerly valid on some mechanical switching systems to allow a call to the other party on a two-party line. Like 4104 (repair, long replaced by 611 in most cities), it was once a standard number in many areas but has disappeared as this equipment (and the party line service itself) has been decommissioned.

In the 1970s and early 1980s, 1199011 was a number that when called would result in another dial tone. Afterwards, if the phone was hung up and then quickly picked up again in less than approximately 1/2 second (ie: a hook flash), a steady tone would then be heard (different from a regular dial tone). Hanging up the phone after this would result in a ring back. When the ring back was answered, the ring back process could be repeated by hanging up and lifting up the phone quickly again, and then hanging up.

Most other numbers listed for ringback are specific to one exchange or one telco; available lists tend to be outdated and unreliable. Many former test numbers (such as 320 and 999 in Bell Canada territory) have been reclaimed for use as standard landline or mobile exchange prefixes, with the test codes moved (usually) to the 958 exchange.

== See also ==
- Plant test number
