= Heta linjen =

1980s Swedish telephone exchange

The heta linjen ("hotline" in Swedish) was a spontaneous and accidental platform for group conversations that emerged among Swedish teenagers around 1981 and became widespread in 1982. Because of a quirk in the design of older telephone exchanges operated by state-run Televerket, people who called into certain disconnected telephone numbers could speak to anyone else on the line for free.

The heta linjen became a phenomenon among Swedish teenagers, with as many as 49 people able to speak with one another on certain disconnected lines. The technological glitch that made the heta linjen possible was patched after about 1,000 teenagers spontaneously met up in Stockholm for what later became known as the heta linjen-upploppet, the "hotline riot." It was replaced by a sanctioned, Televerket-run hotline that received as many as 200 million calls annually in 1988 before it was shut down in 1995.

Along with having been a cultural touchpoint for Swedes who grew up in the 1980s and having facilitated lasting friendships around Sweden, the heta linjen has been called a predecessor of modern social media.

== Background and discovery ==
When a Televerket subscriber moved, it was generally not possible to keep the same telephone number with older telephone exchanges given the structure of their phone exchanges. To keep new subscribers from receiving phone calls meant for the previous subscriber, disconnected phone numbers were kept out of circulation for some period of time.

If someone were to call that disconnected number, they would hear a pre-recorded message, generally something like, "please call 90 120 for messages." At some point around 1981, people realized that if two people called the same disconnected number, they could speak to one another. When a new person called into the number, two loud clicks were heard.

Given the structure of Televerket's back-end infrastructure, its use as an open chat line was possible going back to the 1940s and may have intermittently been used as such.

== The spontaneous heta linjen ==
The ability for teenagers from around Sweden to speak with one another on the phone spread quickly, and teenagers were often spending hours on the phone after school. It provided a particular escape for students living in rural areas, who had not otherwise had the chance to speak with people who lived elsewhere in the country.

Because it was disorganized, phone numbers were often discontinued and new ones discovered, and heta linjen numbers spread either by word of mouth or on calls themselves.

Calls were often chaotic and disorganized, in part because unlike most phone calls in the early 1980s, calls to discontinued heta linjen numbers were generally free, and in part because callers generally used pseudonyms, which made it hard to hold anyone accountable to how they behaved on the heta linjen.

At the beginning, the teenagers' use of the heta linjen was heralded even by Televerket itself. But in the months leading up to the Hotline Riot, complaints rolled in about the heta linjen—both from parents, whose phone lines were taken up by their teenage children spending all evening on the phone, and by other Televerket customers, whose phone numbers were often blocked or jammed by teenagers looking for new open lines.

== The Hotline Riot ==
Even before the Hotline Riot, people who used the heta linjen had used it to see friends, meet up with strangers, and arrange dates.

On September 17, 1982, a group of about a thousand gathered at Rålambshovsparken in Stockholm. The gathering, made up mostly of teenagers and young adults, had no particular objective but had been organized on the heta linjen.

The police went in with riot gear to disperse the crowd. There was some chaos, but by 10 p.m., the crowd had left. Because of the media coverage, however—an Aftonbladet headline the next day read, "Heta linjen fans fought with the police"—Televerket was compelled to fix the glitch that made the heta linjen possible and shut down the service. In the days after the riot, various technical experts were called in to patch the issues that allowed the heta linjen to exist in the first place, though unofficial heta linjen continued to exist for a little while longer.

== Televerket's official hotline ==
Recognizing that it served an important role for teenagers in Sweden, and recognizing the potential to monetize the heta linjen, Televerket launched its own service in November 1982, shortly after the Hotline Riot. Quickly, the heta linjen became a significant source of revenue for Televerket.

Televerket's official service was more limited in its uses: calls were limited to five minutes, and each call was capped at five participants, though that varied slightly from region to region. Although it lost some of its rebellious character, it remained immensely popular, and at its peak in the late 1980s, the heta linjen received as many as 200 million calls annually and was an inescapable part of being young in Sweden in the ’80s.

Despite its popularity among teenagers, public perception of the state-sponsored heta linjen was mixed. As early as 1983, members of the Riksdag complained that its users were running up their families' phone bills and behaving inappropriately.

Those problems compounded, and by the early 1990s, its popularity had waned as new issues emerged. There were increasing reports of abuse, violence, drugs, and women being recruited into prostitution. That, along with the general deregulation of telecommunications and declining use, led to the discontinuation of the service in 1995. Some regions had already discontinued the service by then.

In the decades since the heta linjen was disconnected, the Swedish press has covered the persistence of friendships formed through the service as part of its lasting legacy and as evidence of its role as an early social media platform.

== See also ==
- Beep line, a similar unintended group-call phenomenon in the United States
- Chat line, a telephone service allowing callers to meet and talk with other callers
- Party line, a telephone line shared by multiple subscribers
