= Northwest Communication System =

Landline telecommunications system

The Northwest Communication System was a landline and microwave telecommunications system constructed primarily along the right of way of the Northern Alberta Railway and then the Alaska Highway from Edmonton, Alberta to the Alaska border, after which it connected to Fairbanks, Alaska. It was constructed by the US Signal Corps from 1942 to 1943, and the portion of the line within Canada was transferred to the Canadian government.

Telephone service was provided to cities along the route of the cable, which could be leased by telephone companies. For example, in 1949, it acted as a trunk line providing a route between Peace River area subscriber lines and Edmonton via High Prairie.

The network was initially maintained by the Royal Canadian Air Force, and was then transferred to Canadian National Telegraph in 1946. It provided military and commercial telephone and telegraph service along its route, including air traffic control messages.

Around 1961, it was supplanted by the Grande Prairie-Yukon-Alaska Microwave Network.

Most service in the network was provisioned as party lines. Some numbers were single-subscriber circuits, whereas others served multiple subscribers through selective ringing (suffixes B or F), distinctive ringing (suffixes R1 or R2), or both. Calls were placed through an operator.
