= Beep line =

Type of telephonic conversation

In telephony, beep lines (Note: Other colloquialisms include jam lines, the Grapevine, and the Pipeline. Central office technicians formally referred to them as busy tone conferences.) were improvised conference calls hosted over busy signals, loop-around test tones, or certain automated informational service numbers, active in the United States from the early 1950s to the mid-1980s. These lines allowed callers to communicate with up to dozens of other people simultaneously, the conversations often punctuated by the busy tone "beep" and accompanying intercept message. Such lines were a consequence of the electromechanical nature of switching equipment within the central offices of the public switched telephone network in widespread use at the time. Some journalists have perceived beep lines as an early form of social media.

== History ==
For most of the 20th century, calls were usually placed on the public switched telephone network via electromechanical switching equipment. When a caller dialed a number that was busy or permanently unavailable, the central office of their carrier would shunt the incoming call to a circuit on which the busy signal tone was produced. These busy signal circuits did not have their voice path cut off, and as a result, if two or more people reached the same busy signal, they could potentially talk to each other and host a conversation over the sound of the busy signal. The majority of participants were teenagers using these lines to hold informal conversations with strangers in their locality, as well as to collect the phone numbers of potential dates and friends. Beep lines were also a popular spot for phone phreaks, or people who deliberately experimented with and explored public telephone networks, during the 1970s.

This phenomenon of impromptu conference calls was known among telephone company workers as early as the early 1950s and was first publicized by the International News Service reporter Emily Belser in 1953. In 1961, The Idaho Statesman newspaper termed the practice "moondialing". As central offices did not send answer supervision to busy signals, conversations hosted over these so-called "beep lines" were toll-free in most cases.

Common points of discovery for the beep line in the 1950s and 1960s were call-in segments of radio programs. As dozens of callers attempted to reach the DJ or talk show host at the same time, many would invariably reach a busy signal, through which they could speak to other shunted callers. Another entry point was permanently unavailable numbers or loop-around test numbers intended for internal use by the telephone company. Such numbers were often spread by word of mouth or published in local teen-oriented weeklies. Beep lines proved infectiously popular in the 1960s and 1970s; for example, in 1963 New England Telephone reported a sharp uptick from 1,495 to 27,928 in busy signal calls in one week after a beep line number was published in a teen weekly, according to Time magazine.

The pace of conversations hosted over the beep line was often choppy and monosyllabic if the machinery generating the busy tone was particularly loud. The number of concurrent callers on beep lines at any given time could number between 30 and 40 or potentially more. While beep lines were not initially illegal in the United States, (Note: In Minneapolis by 1974, misuse of the telephone service became a misdemeanor crime carrying a $500 maximum fine and up to six months in jail, although this was almost never enforced beyond warnings.) they were frowned upon by the telephone companies because of their potential to overload a main trunk line in a central office, preventing normal telephone service for a given area and potentially leading to outages for critical lines such as hospitals and emergency services. Some measures within central offices to quash beep lines included making the busy tone louder or by increasing the interruptions per minute of the tone, to the chagrin of regular callers who found these new tones obnoxious. Other actions included implementing devices within the electromechanical switching equipment, such as resistors, to inhibit the voice path; rerouting the busy signals or loop-around numbers; or by upgrading the central office equipment to electronic switching systems (ESS). These measures were expensive to implement at the time and were often to no avail, as beep line enthusiasts would cycle through secretive beep lines or connect to distant exchanges with older electromechanical switching equipment and talk there.

Beep lines continued into the 1980s in some rural areas, but mostly vanished by the mid-1980s as the vast majority of central offices completed the conversion of their equipment to electronic switching systems.

== See also ==
- Party line (telephony)
- Chat line
- Heta linjen, a similar unintended group-call phenomenon in Sweden
