= Telephony =

Field of telecommunication services

Telephony (/təˈlɛfəni/ tə-LEF-ə-nee) is the field of technology involving the development, application, and deployment of telecommunications services for the purpose of electronic transmission of voice, fax, or data, between distant parties. The history of telephony is intimately linked to the invention and development of the telephone.

Telephony is commonly referred to as the construction or operation of telephones and telephonic systems and as a system of telecommunications in which telephonic equipment is employed in the transmission of speech or other sound between points, with or without the use of wires. The term is also used frequently to refer to computer hardware, software, and computer network systems, that perform functions traditionally performed by telephone equipment. In this context the technology is specifically referred to as Internet telephony, or voice over Internet Protocol (VoIP).

== Overview ==
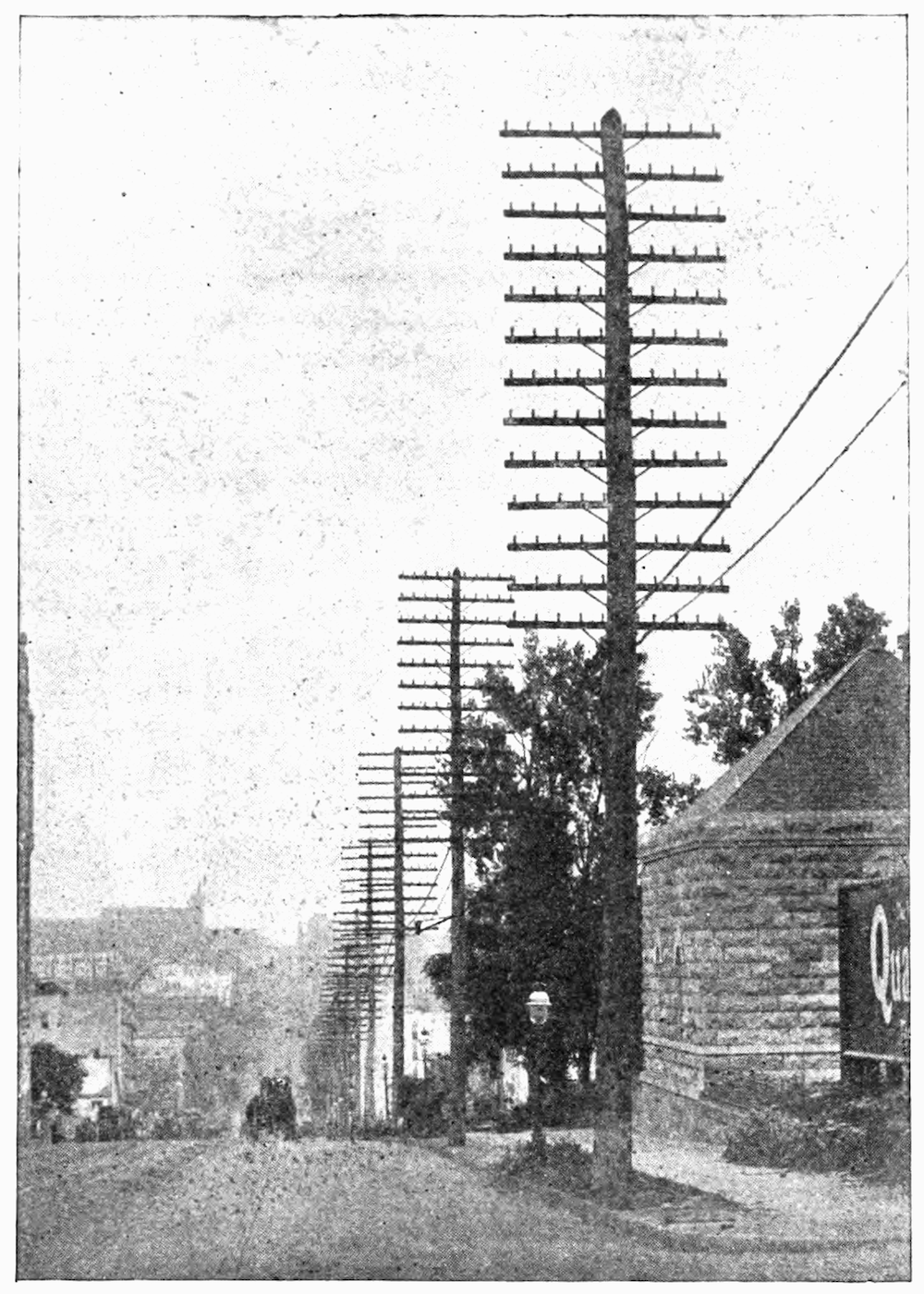
Open wire telephone poles in 1903

The first telephones were connected directly in open wire pairs: each user had a separate telephone wired to each location to be reached. This quickly became inconvenient and unmanageable when users wanted to communicate with more than a few people. The invention of the telephone exchange provided the solution for establishing telephone connections with any other telephone in service in the local area. Each telephone was connected to the exchange at first with one wire, later one wire pair, the local loop. Nearby exchanges in other service areas were connected with trunk lines, and long-distance service could be established by relaying the calls through multiple exchanges.

Initially, exchange switchboards were manually operated by an attendant, commonly referred to as the "switchboard operator". When a customer cranked a handle on the telephone, it activated an indicator on the board in front of the operator, who would in response plug the operator headset into that jack and offer service. The caller had to ask for the called party by name, later by number, and the operator connected one end of a circuit into the called party jack to alert them. If the called station answered, the operator disconnected their headset and completed the station-to-station circuit. Trunk calls were made with the assistance of other operators at other exchangers in the network.

Early telephone networks connected subscribers to local exchanges by dedicated wire pairs. Calls between exchanges were carried over trunk lines that linked switching centers into wider networks. As traffic increased, these trunk routes required large numbers of parallel circuits. Because each circuit occupied its own pair, the cost of long-distance infrastructure grew rapidly. This constraint drove the development of analog carrier systems, which allowed multiple telephone channels to be transmitted over a single pair of wires (carrier telephony). This was part of Bell System's General Toll Switching Plan.

Until the 1970s, most telephones were permanently wired to the telephone line installed at customer premises. Later, conversion to installation of jacks that terminated the inside wiring permitted simple exchange of telephone sets with telephone plugs and allowed portability of the set to multiple locations in the premises where jacks were installed. The inside wiring to all jacks was connected in one place to the wire drop, which connects the building to a cable. Cables usually bring a large number of drop wires from all over a district access network to one wire center or telephone exchange. When a telephone user wants to make a telephone call, equipment at the exchange examines the dialed telephone number and connects that telephone line to another in the same wire center, or to a trunk to a distant exchange. Most of the exchanges in the world are interconnected through a system of larger switching systems, forming the public switched telephone network (PSTN).

In the second half of the 20th century, fax and data became important secondary applications of the network created to carry voices, and late in the century, parts of the network were upgraded with ISDN and DSL to improve handling of such traffic.

Today, telephony uses digital technology (digital telephony) in the provisioning of telephone services and systems. Telephone calls can be provided digitally, but may be restricted to cases in which the last mile is digital, or where the conversion between digital and analog signals takes place inside the telephone. This advancement has reduced costs in communication, and improved the quality of voice services. The first implementation of this, ISDN, permitted all data transport from end-to-end speedily over telephone lines. This service was later made much less important due to the ability to provide digital services based on the Internet protocol suite.

Since the advent of personal computer technology in the 1980s, computer telephony integration (CTI) has progressively provided more sophisticated telephony services, initiated and controlled by the computer, such as making and receiving voice, fax, and data calls with telephone directory services and caller identification. The integration of telephony software and computer systems is a major development in the evolution of office automation. The term is used in describing the computerized services of call centers, such as those that direct a phone call to the right department at a business. It is also sometimes used for the ability to use a personal computer to initiate and manage phone calls.

== Digital telephony ==
Digital telephony is the use of digital electronics in the operation and provisioning of telephony systems and services. Since the late 20th century, a digital core network has replaced the traditional analog transmission and signaling systems, and much of the access network has also been digitized.

Starting with the development of transistor technology, originating from Bell Telephone Laboratories in 1947, to amplification and switching circuits in the 1950s, the public switched telephone network (PSTN) has gradually moved towards solid-state electronics and automation. Following the development of computer-based electronic switching systems incorporating metal–oxide–semiconductor (MOS) and pulse-code modulation (PCM) technologies, the PSTN gradually evolved towards the digitization of signaling and audio transmissions. Digital telephony has since dramatically improved the capacity, quality and cost of the network. Digitization allows wideband voice on the same channel, with improved quality of a wider analog voice channel.

=== History ===
The earliest end-to-end analog telephone networks to be modified and upgraded to transmission networks with Digital Signal 1 (DS1/T1) carrier systems date back to the early 1960s. They were designed to support the basic 3 kHz voice channel by sampling the bandwidth-limited analog voice signal and encoding using pulse-code modulation (PCM). Early PCM codec-filters were implemented as passive resistor–capacitor–inductor filter circuits, with analog-to-digital conversion (for digitizing voices) and digital-to-analog conversion (for reconstructing voices) handled by discrete devices. Early digital telephony was impractical due to the low performance and high costs of early PCM codec-filters.

Practical digital telecommunication was enabled by the invention of the metal–oxide–semiconductor field-effect transistor (MOSFET), which led to the rapid development and wide adoption of PCM digital telephony. In 1957, Frosch and Derick were able to manufacture the first silicon dioxide field effect transistors at Bell Labs, the first transistors in which drain and source were adjacent at the surface. Subsequently, a team demonstrated a working MOSFET at Bell Labs 1960. MOS technology was initially overlooked by Bell because they did not find it practical for analog telephone applications, before it was commercialized by Fairchild and RCA for digital electronics such as computers.

MOS technology eventually became practical for telephone applications with the MOS mixed-signal integrated circuit, which combines analog and digital signal processing on a single chip, developed by former Bell engineer David A. Hodges with Paul R. Gray at UC Berkeley in the early 1970s. In 1974, Hodges and Gray worked with R.E. Suarez to develop MOS switched capacitor (SC) circuit technology, which they used to develop a digital-to-analog converter (DAC) chip, using MOS capacitors and MOSFET switches for data conversion. MOS analog-to-digital converter (ADC) and DAC chips were commercialized by 1974.

MOS SC circuits led to the development of PCM codec-filter chips in the late 1970s. The silicon-gate CMOS (complementary MOS) PCM codec-filter chip, developed by Hodges and W.C. Black in 1980, has since been the industry standard for digital telephony. By the 1990s, telecommunication networks such as the public switched telephone network (PSTN) had been largely digitized with very-large-scale integration (VLSI) CMOS PCM codec-filters, widely used in electronic switching systems for telephone exchanges, private branch exchanges (PBX) and key telephone systems (KTS); user-end modems; data transmission applications such as digital loop carriers, pair gain multiplexers, telephone loop extenders, integrated services digital network (ISDN) terminals, digital cordless telephones and digital cell phones; and applications such as speech recognition equipment, voice data storage, voice mail and digital tapeless answering machines. The bandwidth of digital telecommunication networks has been rapidly increasing at an exponential rate, as observed by Edholm's law, largely driven by the rapid scaling and miniaturization of MOS technology.

Uncompressed PCM digital audio with 8-bit depth and 8 kHz sample rate requires a bit rate of 64 kbit/s, which was impractical for early digital telecommunication networks with limited network bandwidth. A solution to this issue was linear predictive coding (LPC), a speech coding data compression algorithm that was first proposed by Fumitada Itakura of Nagoya University and Shuzo Saito of Nippon Telegraph and Telephone (NTT) in 1966. LPC was capable of audio data compression down to 2.4 kbit/s, leading to the first successful real-time conversations over digital networks in the 1970s. LPC has since been the most widely used speech coding method. Another audio data compression method, a discrete cosine transform (DCT) algorithm called the modified discrete cosine transform (MDCT), has been widely adopted for speech coding in voice-over-IP (VoIP) applications since the late 1990s.

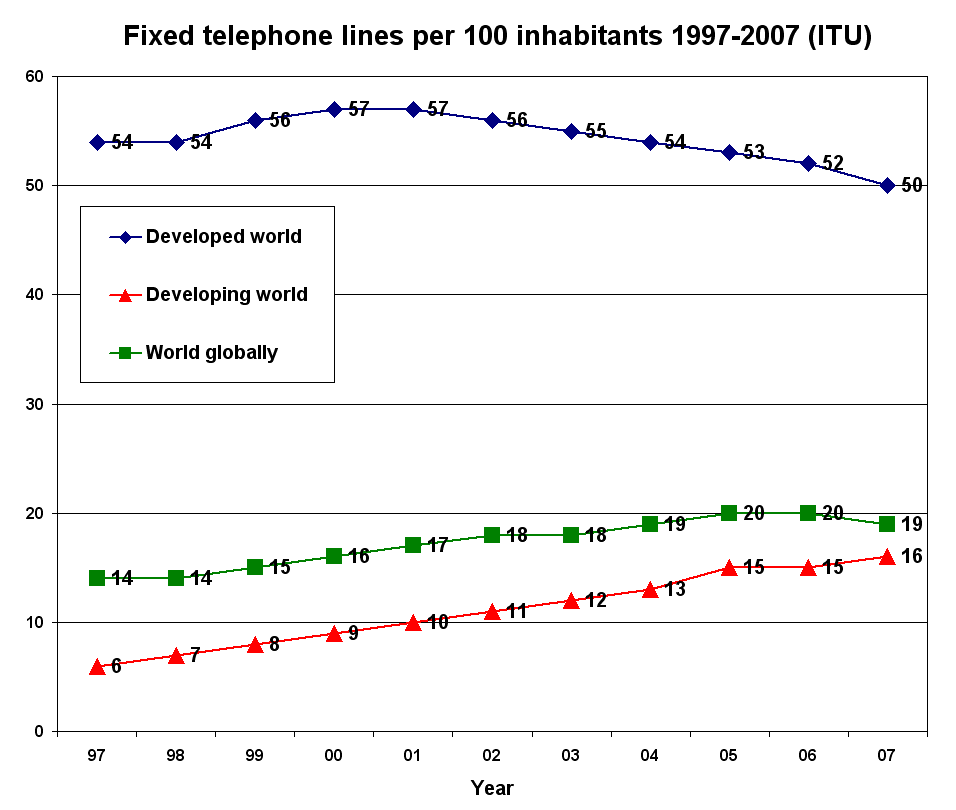
Fixed telephone lines per 100 inhabitants (1997–2007)

The development of transmission methods such as SONET and fiber optic transmission further advanced digital transmission. Although analog carrier systems existed that multiplexed multiple analog voice channels onto a single transmission medium, digital transmission allowed lower cost and more channels multiplexed on the transmission medium. Today the end instrument often remains analog but the analog signals are typically converted to digital signals at the serving area interface (SAI), central office (CO), or other aggregation point. Digital loop carriers (DLC) and fiber to the x place the digital network ever closer to the customer premises, relegating the analog local loop to legacy status.

== IP telephony ==
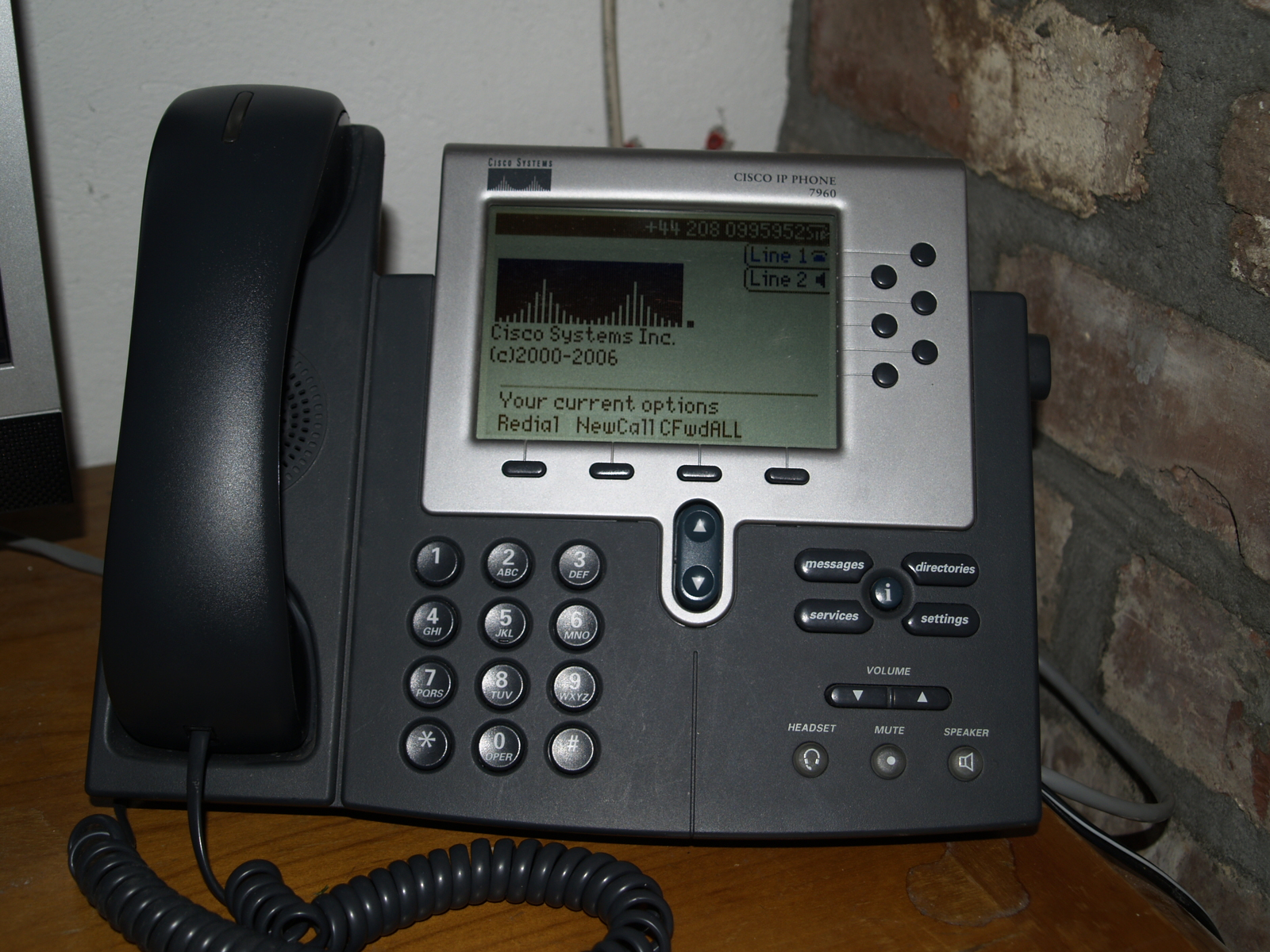
A commercial IP telephone, with keypad, control keys, and screen functions to perform configuration and user features

The field of technology available for telephony has broadened with the advent of new communication technologies. Telephony now includes the technologies of Internet services and mobile communication, including video conferencing.

The new technologies based on Internet Protocol (IP) concepts are often referred to separately as voice over IP (VoIP) telephony, also commonly referred to as IP telephony or Internet telephony. Unlike traditional phone service, IP telephony service is relatively unregulated by government. In the United States, the Federal Communications Commission (FCC) regulates phone-to-phone connections, but says they do not plan to regulate connections between a phone user and an IP telephony service provider.

A specialization of digital telephony, Internet Protocol (IP) telephony involves the application of digital networking technology that was the foundation to the Internet to create, transmit, and receive telecommunications sessions over computer networks. Internet telephony is commonly known as voice over Internet Protocol (VoIP), reflecting the principle, but it has been referred with many other terms. VoIP has proven to be a disruptive technology that is rapidly replacing traditional telephone infrastructure technologies. As of January 2005, up to 10% of telephone subscribers in Japan and South Korea have switched to this digital telephone service. A January 2005 Newsweek article suggested that Internet telephony may be "the next big thing". As of 2006, many VoIP companies offer service to consumers and businesses.

A significant advancement in mobile telephony has been the integration of IP technologies into mobile networks, notably through Voice over LTE (VoLTE) and Voice over 5G (Vo5G). These technologies enable voice calls to be transmitted over the same IP-based infrastructure used for data services, offering improved call quality and faster connections compared to traditional circuit-switched networks. VoLTE and Vo5G are becoming the standard for mobile voice communication in many regions, as mobile operators transition to all-IP networks.

IP telephony uses an Internet connection and hardware IP phones, analog telephone adapters, or softphone computer applications to transmit conversations encoded as data packets. While one of the most common and cost-effective uses of IP telephony is through connections over WiFi hotspots, it is also employed on private networks and over other types of Internet connections, which may or may not have a direct link to the global telephone network.

== Social impact research ==
Direct person-to-person communication includes non-verbal cues expressed in facial and other bodily articulation, that cannot be transmitted in traditional voice telephony. Video telephony restores such interactions to varying degrees. Social Context Cues Theory is a model to measure the success of different types of communication in maintaining the non-verbal cues present in face-to-face interactions. The research examines many different cues, such as the physical context, different facial expressions, body movements, tone of voice, touch and smell.

Various communication cues are lost with the usage of the telephone. The communicating parties are not able to identify the body movements, and lack touch and smell. Although this diminished ability to identify social cues is well known, Wiesenfeld, Raghuram, and Garud point out that there is a value and efficiency to the type of communication for different tasks. They examine work places in which different types of communication, such as the telephone, are more useful than face-to-face interaction.

The expansion of communication to mobile telephone service has created a different filter of the social cues than the land-line telephone. The use of instant messaging, such as texting, on mobile telephones has created a sense of community. In The Social Construction of Mobile Telephony it is suggested that each phone call and text message is more than an attempt to converse. Instead, it is a gesture which maintains the social network between family and friends. Although there is a loss of certain social cues through telephones, mobile phones bring new forms of expression of different cues that are understood by different audiences. New language additives attempt to compensate for the inherent lack of non-physical interaction.

Another social theory supported through telephony is the Media Dependency Theory. This theory concludes that people use media or a resource to attain certain goals. This theory states that there is a link between the media, audience, and the large social system. Telephones, depending on the person, help attain certain goals like accessing information, keeping in contact with others, sending quick communication, entertainment, etc.

== See also ==
- Extended area service
- History of the telephone
- Invention of the telephone
- List of telephony terminology
- Stimulus protocol
