= D-side (UK telephone cabling) =

Telephone cabling term

In a UK telephone line, the term D-side or distribution side refers at any point on a local loop connection between a customer's premises and a telephone exchange to the wires (or pairs of copper wires) leaving into the direction of the customer. Conversely, E-side is the exchange side of a telephone line, that is the wires leaving any connection point into the direction of the telephone exchange.

These terms are used, for example, by technicians of Openreach, Virgin Media and other UK phone companies when referring to wiring connections going from a Primary Connection Point (PCP) telecoms cabinet to a point closer to a residence or business known as the "Distribution Point" (DP). On its way, it may pass through a Secondary Connection Point (SCP) telecoms cabinet, sometimes known as pillars, where again the wires going in the direction of the customer are called D side and those going back to exchange are called E side.

In the event of a broadband or phone line problem, technicians will test at any connection point whether the problem is D-side or E-side of that point, by disconnecting the wires on both ends and measuring connectivity and insulation. One potential correction that might be made is then to connect an alternative wire pair on the affected side, if available, or identify and repair the cable fault location.
