= Plant test number =

Telecommunication facility for telephone line testing

In telecommunications, a plant test number is a telephone number reserved for use by telephone installers or other workers to test an individual telephone line. Test numbers are typically unlisted.

The North American Numbering Plan (NANP) reserves the exchange (central office) prefixes 958 and 959 for plant testing. Central office code 958 is intended for communications between switching centers. Central office code 959 with three or four additional digits is dedicated for access to office test lines in local exchange carrier (LEC) and interoffice carrier (IC) central offices. The specifications define several test features for line conditions, such as quiet line and busy line, and test tones transmitted to callers.

The tests available for plant testing include

- Automatic number announcement circuit, a machine which announces the caller's number
- Loop around, a primitive conference call bridge
- Milliwatt test, a standardized 1004 Hz, zero dBm sinusoidal test tone used to measure line quality and transmission loss between stations.
- Ringback number, which causes the calling telephone to ring to verify an installation is working and the phone number routing properly.

Some localities reserve only 958 or 959.

Each country uses different codes. BT Linetest Facilities (for example) are available by ringing 17070 and a self-service test facility for subscribers is no longer available.
