= Stimulus protocol =

In telephony, a stimulus protocol is a type of protocol that is used to carry event notifications between end points. Such a protocol is used to control the operation of devices at each end of the link. However, a stimulus protocol is not sensitive to the system state. In a typical application such a protocol will carry keystroke information from a telephone set to a central call control. It may also carry control information for simple types of text displays. MiNET from Mitel is a typical protocol of this sort.

Stimulus protocols are most suited to networks with dumb peripherals and intelligent centralized applications (see intelligent network). This is in contrast to functional protocols which are best suited to a network with an intelligent periphery and a dumb core (see dumb network). Because these architectures share core hardware over large numbers of peripherals, large and expensive computing capabilities in terms of both hardware and software may be supplied. These centralized architectures excel in solving the problems of complexity for large scale applications since the investment in hardware and software may be amortized across a great many users. However, the same virtue of large scale sharing prevents these architectures from providing any significant degree of customization to the preferences of the individual user. The most that can be supplied is a degree of parameterization of service operation.

With their suitability tied to the virtues of centralized network architectures, stimulus protocols are being deprecated in favor of functional protocols with the rise of the Internet. A functional protocol such as Session Initiation Protocol (SIP) from the IETF is more suited for Internet applications.
