= Metallic path facilities =

Metallic path facility (MPF) are the unshielded twisted pair of copper wires that run from a main distribution frame (MDF) at a local telephone exchange to the customer. In this variant, both broadband and voice (baseband) services, together potentially with a video on demand service, are provided to the end user by a single communications provider. MPF services are typically delivered through use of an MSAN.

Shared metallic path facility (SMPF) is based on the same technology as MPF, but denotes a variant whereby an Internet service provider (ISP) provides a broadband service to the end user but hands the voice (baseband) service back to the PTT/ILEC. Hence the provision of services over the end users copper wires might be shared between two providers. With SMPF, the non-incumbent service provider could purchase wholesale the voice service provision from the PTT/ILEC to allow the former to control the customer relationship for both broadband and voice services. In the UK at least, this service is called Wholesale Line Rental (WLR). SMPF services are typically delivered through use of a DSLAM.

Both terms are commonly used, for example by Ofcom and Openreach in the UK, to denote a local-loop unbundling service, designed to ensure a former monopoly player (deemed to have Significant Market Power, or SMP) allows a level playing field or Equivalence of Inputs.

== See also ==
- Local loop
- Local-loop unbundling
- Main distribution frame
- Telephone exchange
