= Utility box art =

Form of street art

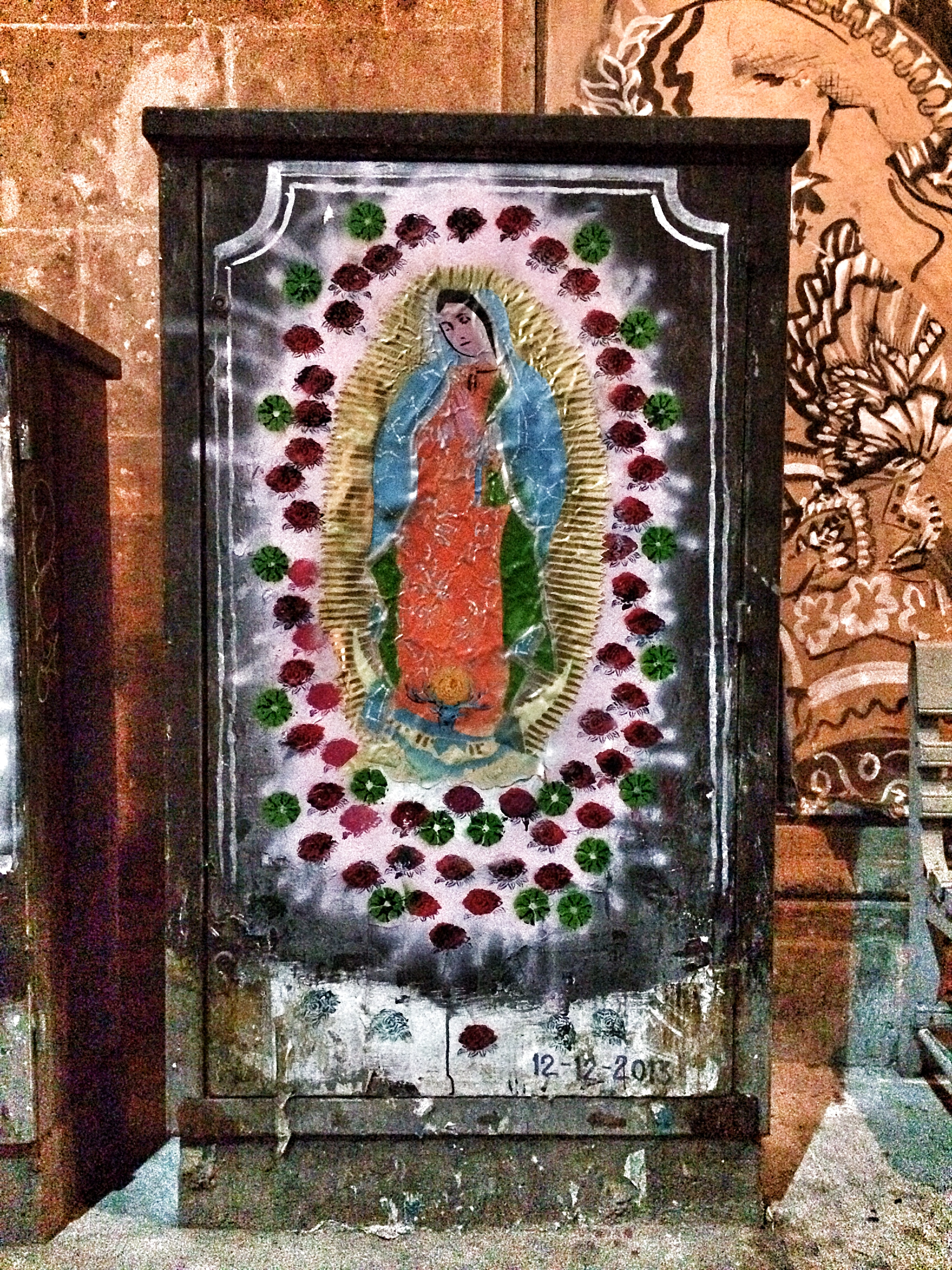
Virgin of Guadalupe as utility box art, colonia Roma, Mexico City

Utility box art is a form of street art whereby utility boxes on city streets are painted or otherwise covered in artwork.

== In cities around the world ==
- Auckland, New Zealand: Paul Walsh series of painted utility boxes. Walsh is inspired by Internet memes.
- Fort Collins, Colorado: Started the first program in the country to paint utility boxes as graffiti abatement in 2004. The program has been very successful, and paid artists have painted over 375 boxes in the city as of 2021.
- Glendale, California: in January 2014, city officials solicited proposals from artists to paint murals on 26 utility boxes downtown, as part of a greater effort to make the city more arts-friendly like fellow Los Angeles suburbs Santa Monica and Pasadena.

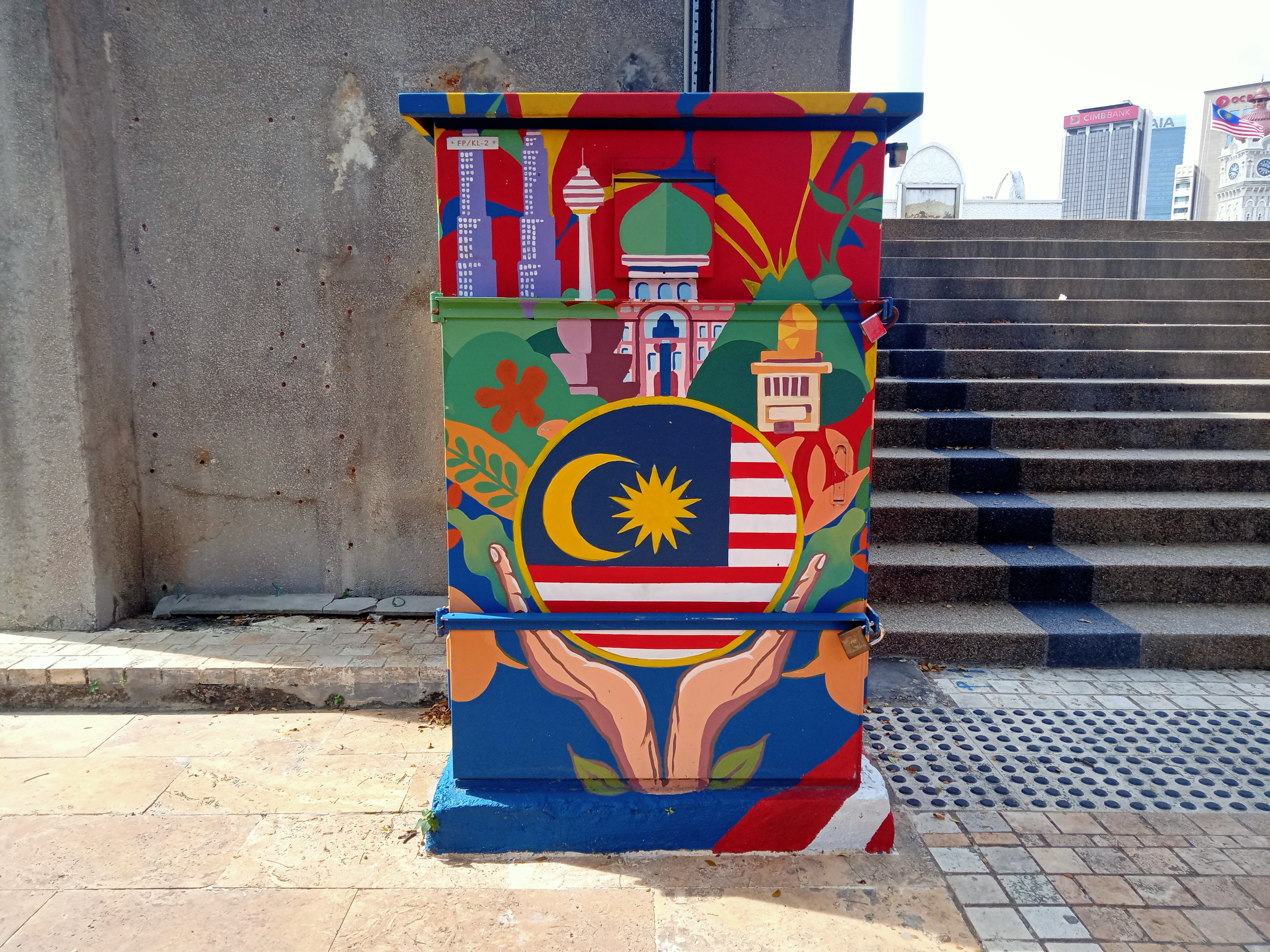
Utility box art found nearby Dataran Merdeka, Kuala Lumpur

- Kuala Lumpur, Malaysia: Launched in the late 2020, the utility boxes owned by the Kuala Lumpur City Hall along with other properties were colourfully painted to transform the rundown areas, to bring more vibrant to the city and to attract more domestic and international tourists.
- Los Angeles: in Downtown Los Angeles, utility boxes were painted in a project taking place during January 2014. The micro-public art project began in Boyle Heights along the First Street Corridor and expanded into downtown and is led by councilman José Huizar.
- Santa Ana, California: in July 2013, as part of efforts to beautify the city, the Santa Ana City Council set up a Utility Box Art Project and launched a call for artists, with a stipend of $700 for each box plus $200 for supplies.
- Sequim, Washington sponsors a utility box art program and so far painted utility boxes include those by artists Gary Robertson, Katelin Ghormley and Dale Faulstich.
- Madison, Wisconsin began placing art on City-owned utility boxes in fall of 2016.
- Costa Mesa, California: In early 2015 the City Of Costa Mesa Cultural Arts Committee launched a utility box art program that features beautiful work from several talented artists. Local photographer Wade McDonald who is known for his unique colorful underwater marine life images can be found on the corner of Bristol & Paularino next to the Hilton Hotel not far from the world-renowned South Coast Plaza Shopping Mall.
- Brisbane, Queensland: In 1999, artist and Brisbane City councillor David Hinchcliffe painted 30 traffic light control boxes in his spare time. This was well received by the community and a permanent public art project (Artforce Brisbane) was subsequently established by the city council.
