= Distinctive ring =

Distinctive ring, marketed under a variety of names, is a service offered by a telephone company that establishes additional telephone numbers on the same line as an existing number, each number ringing with a distinctive ringing pattern. Typically, the original number rings with the standard ring pattern that is common to the nation where the line is connected. Regardless of what ringing pattern the called party hears, the calling party hears the standard ringing pattern.

== Hardware ==
Adjunct hardware can be employed with this service. For example, if two or three people, as roommates, share a residence, each can have his/her own telephone number, and a phone set in his/her own bedroom, equipped with a "ring selector" that is set to filter out all but one particular ringing pattern. When an incoming call rings with a pattern other than the one selected, the telephone set connected to the device would not ring at all, sparing the occupant an intrusion.

Some fax machines and dial-up modems support distinctive ring natively through a configuration option which causes the device to answer one selected ring type only.

== Brand names ==
In Ontario, the feature is commonly referred to as Ident-a-Call (Bell Canada), in western Canada Smart Ring (Telus and Northwestel), as well as Teen Ring. In the United States, AT&T refers to the feature as RingMaster, in Australia Telstra refers to the feature as Duet and in the UK, it's known as Call Sign by British Telecom. The feature can be used, in conjunction with ring-recognition software or hardware, to allow voice and fax to share a single phone line, though with only one call at a time. It is also often promoted as a means of incoming call recognition when the line often rings for other members of the household.

== See also ==
- Ringtone
- Party line (telephony)
