= End of Active Service =

Conclusion of active duty by a member of the U.S. Armed Forces

End of Active Service (EAS) is the conclusion of the period of active duty commitment for a member of the U.S. Army, U.S. Marine Corps or the U.S. Air Force. The equivalent term used by the U.S. Navy and U.S. Coast Guard is the End of Active Obligated Service (EAOS).

This date can be changed by re-enlistment, extension, retirement, renewal of active orders, and administrative separation, among other things. This is not to be confused with Expiration of Current Contract (ECC) or Expiration of Obligated Service (EOS).

== See also ==
- Separation (United States military)
