= Party line (telephony) =

Type of shared telephone line

A party line (multiparty line, shared service line, party wire) is a local loop telephone circuit that is shared by multiple telephone service subscribers.

Party line systems were widely used to provide telephone service, starting with the first commercial switchboards in 1878. A majority of Bell System subscribers in the mid-20th century in the United States and Canada were served by party lines, which had a discount over individual service. During wartime shortages, these were often the only available lines.

British users similarly benefited from the party line discount. Farmers in rural Australia and South Africa used party lines, where a single line spanned miles from the nearest town to one property and on to the next.

== History ==
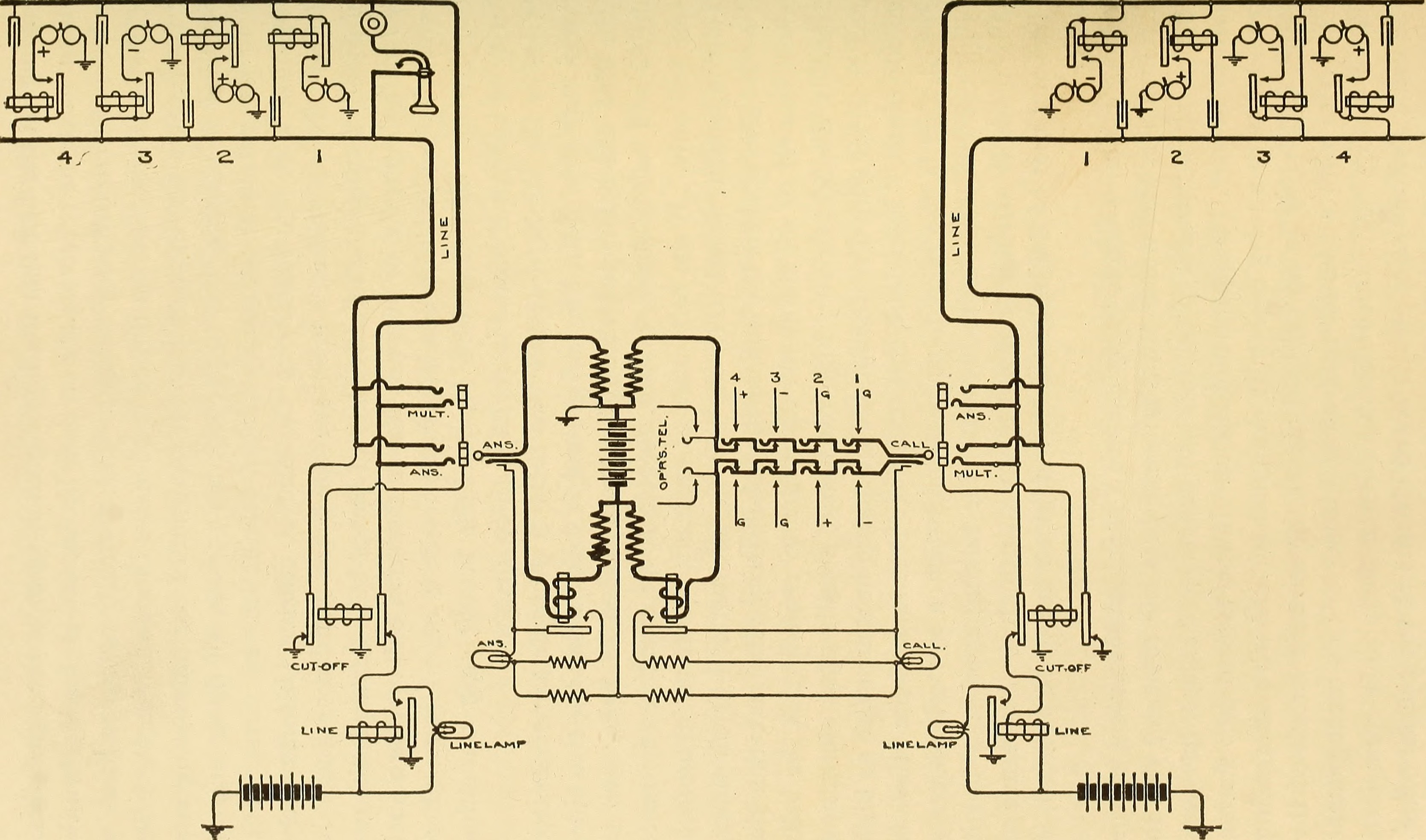
Circuit diagram, 1905

Telephone companies offered party lines beginning in the late 1800s, although subscribers in all but the most rural areas may have had the option to upgrade to individual line service at an additional monthly charge. The service was common in sparsely populated areas where subscribers were spread across large distances. An example is Australia where these were operated by the Government Postmaster General's Department. In rural areas in the early 20th century, additional subscribers and telephones, often numbering several dozen, were frequently connected to the single loop available.

Party lines provided no privacy in communication. They were frequently used as a source of entertainment and gossip, as well as a means of quickly alerting entire neighbourhoods of emergencies such as fires, becoming a cultural fixture of rural areas for many decades.

The rapid growth of telephone service demand, especially after WWII, resulted in many party line installations in the middle of the 20th century in the United States. This often led to traffic congestion in the telephone network, as the line to a destination telephone was often busy. Nearly three-quarters of Pennsylvania residential service in 1943 was party line, with users encouraged to limit calls to five minutes. Shortages persisted for years after each war; individual lines in Montreal remained in short supply at the end of 1919 and similar shortages were reported by telephone companies in Florida as late as 1948. Some rural users had to run their own wires to reach the utility's lines.

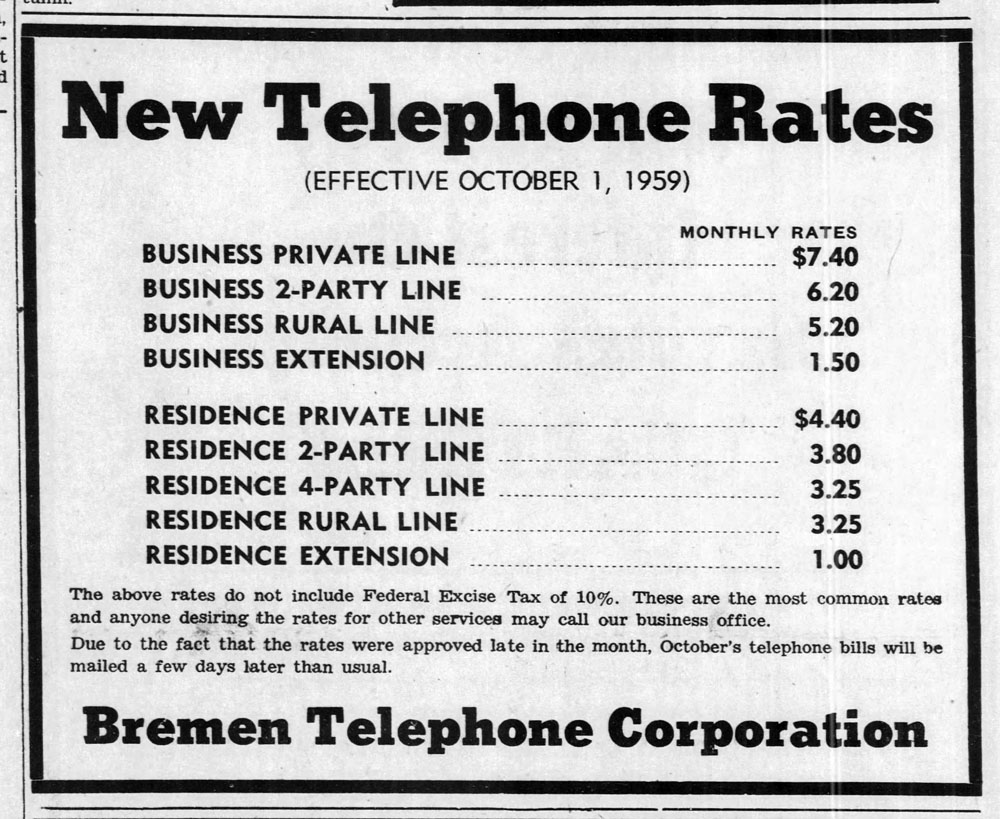
1959 rates for telephone lines in Indiana. Subscribers in town could choose an individual line or a line shared by two or four parties. All rural lines were party lines shared with several neighbors.

Objections about one party monopolizing a multi-party line were a staple of complaints to telephone companies and letters to advice columnists for years and eavesdropping on calls remained an ongoing concern.

In December 1942, University of Tennessee's strategy in an American football game versus University of Mississippi was revealed to the opposing coach, when a telephone on the Ole Miss team's bench had been inadvertently wired to the same party line. In May 1952, an alleged bookmaking operation in St. Petersburg, Florida, was shut down after one month of operation in a rented storefront using a party-line telephone. In June 1968, the conviction of three Winter Park, Florida, men on bookmaking charges was overturned as police had used a party-line telephone in a rented house on the same line as the suspects to unlawfully intercept their communications.

In 1956, Southern Bell officials refused a request from a public utilities commissioner in Jackson, Mississippi, to segregate party telephone lines on racial boundaries.

While primitive lockout devices to prevent two subscribers from picking up the same line at the same time were proposed relatively early, multiple simultaneous calls did not become viable until the initial tests of transistorised pair gain devices in 1955. Any handset off-hook therefore tied up the line for everyone.

Many jurisdictions required a person engaged in a call on a party line to end the call immediately if another party needed the line for an emergency. Such laws also provided penalties for abuse by falsifying emergency situations. In May 1955, a Rhinebeck, New York, woman was indicted by a grand jury after her refusal to relinquish a party line delayed a volunteer firefighter's effort to report a grass fire. The fire destroyed a shed and a barn. She was given a suspended sentence. In June 1970, a sixteen-year-old girl and a woman were charged after refusing to relinquish a party line to allow a distress call as three boys drowned in a pond in Walsenburg, Colorado.

=== Decommissioning ===
By the late 1980s, party lines were removed in most locales. They were not supported by new technologies and subscriber-owned equipment such as answering machines and computer modems. Meanwhile, the electro-mechanical switching equipment required for their operation was rapidly becoming obsolete, supplanted by electronic and digital switching equipment. The new telephone exchange equipment offered vertical service code calling features such as call forwarding and call waiting, but often was incompatible with multi-party lines. Party lines in the United States were ineligible for Universal Service Fund subsidies, leading telephone companies to convert them to individual lines to benefit from these subsidies.

In 1971, Southern Bell announced plans to gradually phase out all party lines in North Carolina.

One of the last manual telephone exchanges with party lines in Australia was closed down in 1986 in the township of Collarenebri, where most town residents had a telephone number of only three digits. To make a call outside the exchange area it was necessary to call the exchange to place a call. For rural residents, many were on a single telephone line identified by a number and a property name, such as "Gundabluie 1". Each party on that single line was identified by a letter, and the ringing pattern for that party would consist of the corresponding letter in Morse code. This distinctive ring would alert all parties on the line who the call was for.

In 1989, the Chesapeake and Potomac Telephone Company replaced party lines with individual lines in Talcott, West Virginia, a rural area which once had as many as sixteen subscribers on one line. Universities also phased out the systems, which were once common in student dormitories. Illinois State University terminated its last party line in 1990. Woodbury, Connecticut's independent telephone company abandoned its last party lines in 1991, the last in that state to do so. The same year, Southwestern Bell announced its intentions to replace all of its party lines in Texas with individual line service by November 1994, and the company's last party line finally shut down in 1996.

Pacific Bell phased out most of its party lines by 1997, and the last ones operating in Nevada shut down in 2001. SBC Ameritech still had operating party lines in Michigan as late as 2002. USA Today reported in 2000 that over 5,000 party lines still existed in the United States, but the majority of them were only connected to one telephone, and therefore appeared like individual telephone service at cheaper rates.

== Selective ringing ==
To signal specific subscribers on party lines selectively, telephone operating companies implemented various signaling systems.

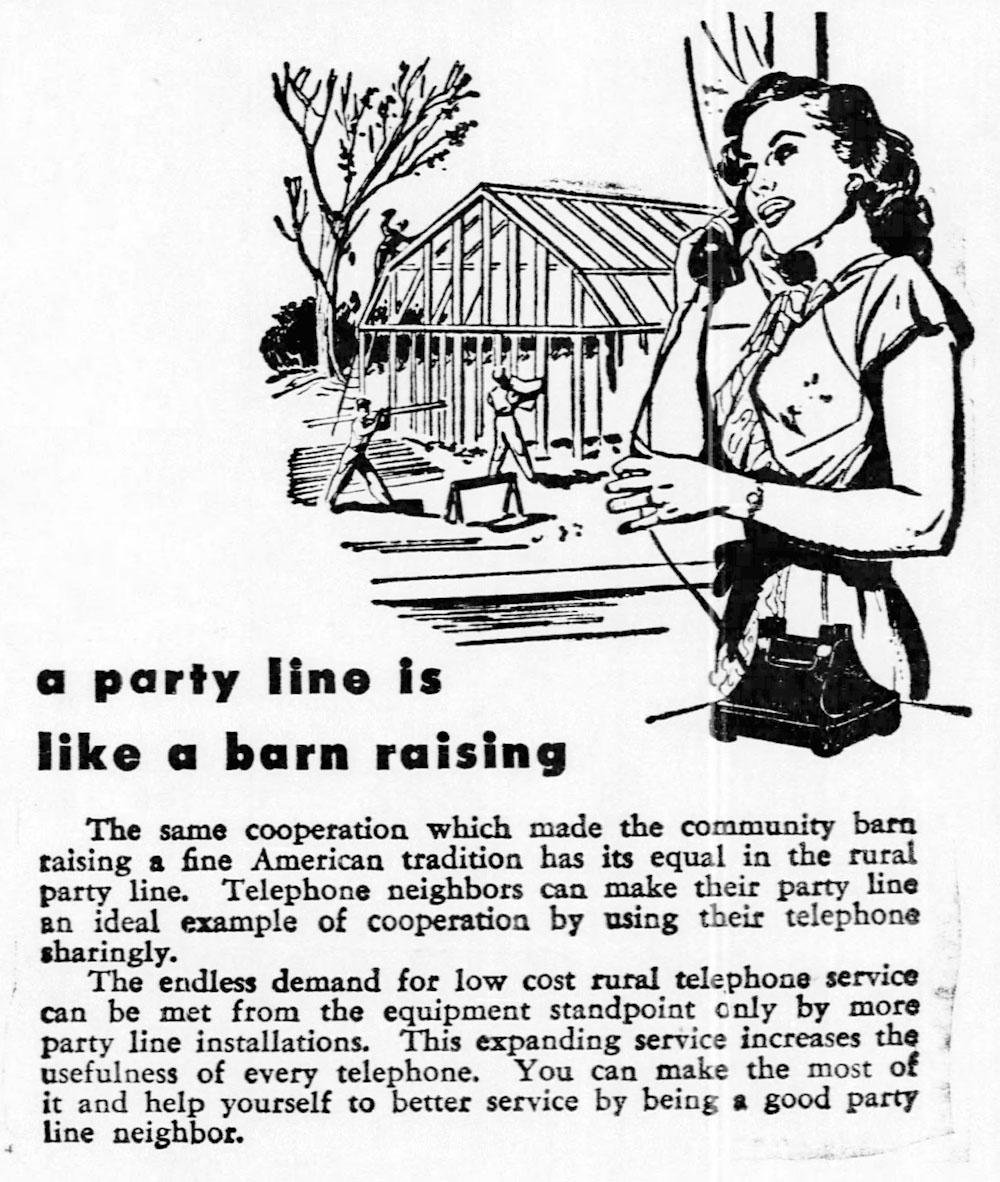
As upgrades made party lines more popular in the 1940s, local telephone companies ran frequent ads to instill community spirit and personal courtesy in party-line subscribers.

The earliest selective system was the code ringing system, in which each telephone subscriber was assigned a specific ringing cadence (not to be confused with modern ring tones).

Although various systems were implemented, one that limited the number of coded rings but established a uniform and readily understood format, was to first give the subscriber number as individual digits, which could be from one to four digits long per exchange, separated by the instructional word "ring" followed by the two digits of the ring code where the first digit indicated the number of long rings, followed by the second digit indicating the number of short rings. Thus spoken, for example, as "nine, three; ring two, two" to mean subscriber No. 93 with ringing code 2 long and 2 short, and written as "93R22", (and if outside the given exchange, then the exchange would be asked for by name before the requested number and ringing code, e.g. "Rockridge nine, three; ring one, two" i.e. "(On the) Rockridge (exchange), (subscriber No.) nine, three; ring one long, and two short," and written as “Rockridge 93R12”. (The two examples cited in this paragraph are taken directly from usage in the 1935 American film Party Wire.) Whilst this practice was common, it was not ubiquitous, since despite giving a standard configuration for terse, easily interpreted numbers with their respective ring codes, its chief functional drawback was with the first ring always being long and the second always being short, which limited the number of brief and thus practical ringing combinations that could be used on single multiparty subscriber numbers.

Further to this functional deficiency was a twofold practical deficiency. For though one was only to answer one's own ringing code, every party on the same subscriber line could hear all the ringing codes. This meant firstly, frequently ringing telephones were a disruptive annoyance, as each party on the line had to stop to listen every time the telephone rang to determine if they were the party being called on any given ring. Secondly, if any party on a given line should so be inclined, there was the opportunity to listen to other parties' calls.

More selective ringing methods were introduced using various technologies.

In the system of divided ringing, the ringing circuit was separated from the talking circuit by adding a ground connection between the central office and the subscriber stations for ringing. On the same subscriber line, one party used the tip side of the line and ground for ringing, whilst the other party on the same line used the ring wire and ground for ringing, to achieve full selectivity for two-party lines, in which only the selected station would ring. These names for the wires are derived from the paired cord plugs—used on a manual switchboard—composed of three parts: the tip and the sleeve separated by a narrow metal band called the ring, each of these three components being insulated from one another.

In the Bell System, the two stations were thus called the tip party and the ring party, In combination with code ringing, this method could be extended to four and eight subscribers to reduce the number of disturbances. In several variations of divided ringing, also called grounded ringing, the bells were activated with polarized current, so that full selectivity was achieved for up to four parties.

Another selective ringing system was based on using different ringing frequencies for each station on the party line. In North America, this was used mostly by independent telephone systems, while the Bell System abandoned frequency selective ringing in the early 1900s. Initially four frequencies were used, which were based on a system of harmonic multiples of a frequency of 16 2/3 Hz. Combined with divided ringing, this provided fully selective service for up to eight stations.

All fully selective ringing systems on party lines still brought the inconvenience of finding the line in use occasionally, by hearing talking when one picked up the phone to make a call. All party lines also required special equipment to complete calls to another party on the same party line.

== Characteristics ==
In the local-battery system of the early cranked magneto phones, the phone's own battery powered its transmitter as well as the receiver of the called phone. If too many phones were off-hook and listening, the additional receivers would load down the transmitter's battery with a voltage so low that no phone could receive an intelligible signal.

With party-line service, particularly if there were more than two subscribers on the line, it was often necessary to complete a long-distance call through the operator to identify and correctly bill the calling party. In some cases, the calling party would misidentify themselves in an attempt to send the bill to another party.

A two-party line split between tip party and ring party could be created in such a way as to allow the central office to determine which party placed an outbound toll call by detecting that one of the ringers was disconnected when that subscriber went off-hook. This system would fail if any provision was made to allow the subscriber to turn off the bells (do not disturb) for privacy or unplug the telephone. It also presumed that each subscriber only had one telephone connected to the line.

One variation of identifying the calling party on direct-dialed long-distance calls is a party code, usually a single digit inside a circle displayed on the phone's number tag. The dialing sequence for such calls is "1" (access number for DDD), the party code, the area code, and the desired number (1 + party code + area code + number).

Systems which identify the caller's name and address to emergency telephone numbers (such as Enhanced 9-1-1 in North America) may be unable to identify which of multiple parties on a shared line placed a distress call; this is aggravated by the use of old mechanical switching equipment for party lines as this obsolete apparatus consistently provides no caller ID and often also lacks automatic number identification capability.

When the party line was already in use, if any of the other subscribers to that line picked up the phone, they could hear and participate in the conversation. Eavesdropping opportunities abounded. If one of the parties used the phone heavily, then the inconvenience for the others was more than occasional, as depicted in the 1959 comedy film Pillow Talk. Dialing one's own number and hanging up would make all phones on the network ring, resulting in the residents on the system (sometimes a half a dozen or more) all answering the phone at the same time. This was sometimes used as a form of prank call, but could also be employed as a form of early warning system for the immediate area, a user could alert all local residents at once. Party lines were typically operated using mechanical switching systems which recognized certain codes for revertive calls; these no longer work on modern electronic or digital switchgear.

Party lines are not suitable for Internet access. If one customer is using dial-up, it will jam the line for all other customers of the same party line. Bridge taps made party lines unsuitable for DSL, even in the few areas where distance from the central office did not already preclude its use. Telephone companies typically do not allow client-owned equipment to be directly connected to party lines, posing an additional obstacle to their use for data.

== Barbed wire telephone lines ==
Barbed wire telephone lines were local networks created in rural United States around the turn of the 20th century. In some isolated farming communities, it was not cost-effective for corporations to invest in the telephone infrastructure. Instead, the existing extent of barbed wire fences could be used to transmit electric signals and connect telephones in neighboring farms. Such networks could be isolated to allow individual communication but were almost always party lines, and specific recipients were determined by manually generated ringing codes.

These networks proliferated after some parts of Bell Telephone's patent structure expired in 1894, which made it possible for other companies to sell telephones that were then used for creating networks outside the Bell Telephone network.

In 1902, The New York Times reported that ranchers in Montana were instituting a telephone exchange in Fort Benton with the goal of eventually connecting every city in the state. The main purpose of such networks was to transmit weather conditions and forecasts, as well as train schedules.

These networks were documented as being in use across the American West and Canada, and sources claim they may have survived into the 1970s. A benefit of the simplicity and robustness of early telephones and networks is that they could be directly connected to the barbed wire with no modification, with one battery establishing a voltage difference between the two wires used for the voice channel and powering the whole network. They worked with wire stapled to wooden fenceposts, but worked better if the wire were insulated from the fencepost because rain tended to degrade operation of uninsulated systems.

== Railroad systems ==
Telephone service for dispatchers and service personnel between way stations along railways used a form of party line service for many decades starting in the early 1900s. Railroad telephone systems often consisted of several dozen way stations interconnected with a shared line that used DC voltages as high as 400 V for selective signaling to alert called stations.

== Carrier systems ==
With the advent of sophisticated electronics, telephone service providers developed methods to share a single copper line to transmit multiple telephone calls simultaneously. Various pair gain methods using time-division multiplexing and frequency-division multiplexing prevented interference between simultaneous calls. A distant suburb may have a subscriber loop carrier or digital loop carrier system in which a remote concentrator is located near the subscribers to connect multiple local subscriber loops to one common line to a central office exchange. A single optical fibre can also be shared between multiple subscribers in fibre to the cabinet systems.

CATV cable modems are connected to an inherently shared medium. The signal from the shared line is split to multiple subscribers. Signals for television, and data operate at various different carrier frequencies.

Digital wireless connections, such as mobile phones or voice over IP running over rural wireless Internet infrastructure are also inherently a shared medium. Sufficiently high levels of usage of simultaneous active connections cause congestion on a mobile telephone network or impair transmission quality.

== Modern usage ==
Party lines are still in use primarily in rural areas where local loops are long and individual circuits are uneconomical when spread sparsely over a large area. Privacy is limited and congestion often occurs. In isolated communities, party lines have been used for local service only, without the facilities to switch calls through a central office for connection to the public switched telephone network.

An example of a community linked by a party line is in Big Santa Anita Canyon high in the mountains above Los Angeles, near Sierra Madre, California. A group camp, a pack station and 81 cabins all communicate by magneto-type crank phones. One ring is for the pack station, two rings is for the camp and three rings means "all cabins pick up." There are also eight emergency telephone stations located along the hiking trail. The system is a single wire using the ground as a return path. Maintenance of the line was assumed by the association of cabin owners in 2018.

In modern use, the term party line has occasionally been used to market conference calling and voice bulletin board services.

== In popular culture ==
Party line telephone service is demonstrated in the episode "Party Line" of the television series, Alfred Hitchcock Presents (Season 5, Episode 33; aired May 29, 1960, on CBS). Party lines are a focal plot point of the 1959 Doris Day and Rock Hudson film Pillow Talk.

Party line telephone service is demonstrated in an episode of I Love Lucy titled "Redecorating" (Season 2, Episode 8, aired November 24, 1952). Lucy, awaiting a phone call from a furniture contest, checks to see if her phone is working. She picks up the receiver and complains about party lines. Two women are shown gossiping on a party line, refusing to get off the phone after Lucy claims an emergency.

Party line telephone service is used in the novel Our Evenings by Alan Hollinghurst. In chapter 8, Dave is listening in on two men discussing secret affairs, and in chapter 10 he is asking one of his mothers customers if she has a party line.

A constantly busy party line is a running gag in the 1962 film Mr. Hobbs Takes a Vacation.

Code ringing is referenced in Jetta Carleton's 1962 novel The Moonflower Vine, when "the telephone on the dining room wall rang two shorts and a long."

== See also ==
- Distinctive ring
- Conference call
- Beep line
- Group call
- Chat line
- Heta linjen
