= Chat line =

Allows people to meet via telephone

A chat line is a service that allows people to meet and talk with others via telephone call. When multiple people can join the call, they are also called party lines.

== Description ==
A chat line service introduces users to others to with via telephone call, often for a particular topic of interest. The service may facilitate one-on-one communication or group interactions. Chat lines may be similar to CB radio in which a number of people both listen and speak together; the term party line may be used for group calls. Chat lines have been likened to the "precursor to the internet chat room".

Chat lines may be used for dating to connect users looking for companionship or various other reasons. Users of chat lines call the phone number of a chat line provider to setup their profile and get matched with a person or group. Many modern services employ moderation and security features.

== Usage ==
Modern chat line services typically operate through automated telephony systems that guide callers through a series of voice prompts before connecting them to other participants. After dialing a service number, users may create a short voice introduction, listen to recordings from other callers, and choose whether to initiate a live conversation. Many systems use interactive voice response (IVR) technology and call routing software to manage multiple simultaneous conversations and match users based on preferences or geographic location. These services may support both one-on-one conversations and group discussions similar to traditional party lines.

== History ==
In the 1980s in the United States, party lines were advertised on television and frequently used by teenagers. Services typically charged for use at a rate based on the number of minutes using the service. To restrict access to chat lines, telephone customers employed the ability to pay a fee and block access to phone numbers from the 900 Service Corporation.

During the 1980s and early 1990s, chat lines became part of the broader premium-rate telephone industry in the United States. Many operated through local 976 exchanges or 900 numbers, allowing callers to participate in group conversations or listen and respond to recorded personal introductions. Callers were generally charged through their telephone bills, often according to the duration of the call.

Concerns about unexpected charges, misleading advertising, and access by minors resulted in increased federal regulation. The Telephone Disclosure and Dispute Resolution Act of 1992 led to rules requiring 900-number services to disclose their prices in advertisements and provide a free introductory message before charges began. Telephone companies were also required to make 900-number blocking available to customers.

As internet chat rooms and online dating services expanded during the 1990s and 2000s, telephone chat services increasingly moved away from premium-rate numbers. Later services commonly used toll-free or local telephone numbers, automated voice menus, recorded greetings, and separate payment systems.

== See also ==
- Instant messaging
- Online chat
- Chat room
- Beep line
- Party line (telephony)
- Synchronous conferencing
- Videotelephony
