= Milliwatt test =

Analog telephone system test in telecommunications

A Milliwatt test (Milliwatt line) is a test method or test facility used in telecommunications to measure line quality and transmission loss between stations or points in an analog telephone system.

The test consists of transmitting an analog sinusoidal signal at the frequency of 1004 Hz with the power level of 0 (zero) dBm. By definition, this is the equivalent of a continuous power dissipation of 1 mW (milliWatt), i.e., the power consumed if a voltage of 0.775 V(RMS) is applied to a telephone line with 600 Ohm nominal impedance.

In the Bell System, central offices provided this type of service on a dedicated telephone number (102 type Milliwatt line) for remote subscriber line testing. In conjunction, a second line (type 100 line) provided quiet termination. Various types of test lines were known as "100", "102", "104" etc., because these numbers accessed the test line in tandem offices in lieu of an area code.

In digital central office installations, the Milliwatt test facility was implemented using a synthesized version of the 1004 Hz signal, often known as the digital milliwatt. +1 (503) 697-1000 is an example of such a Milliwatt from a digital central office.

== See also ==
- Loop around
- Plant test number
- Transmission level point
