= Early Admissions Scheme (Hong Kong) =

- 優先錄取計劃
- Formation: 2002/03
- Dissolved: 2010/11
- Legal status: Defunct
- Purpose: Higher-education application processing
- Location: Hong Kong
- Parent organisation: Joint University Programmes Admissions System

Early Admissions Scheme
- Traditional Chinese: 優先錄取計劃
Transcriptions
Yue: Cantonese
- Yale Romanization: Yāu sīn luhk chéui gai waahk
- Jyutping: Jau1 sin1 luk6 cheoi2 gai3 waak6

The Early Admissions Scheme (EAS) was a subsystem of the Joint University Programmes Admissions System (JUPAS) developed by the University Grants Committee of Hong Kong. The scheme had been adopted between the academic year of 2002/03 to 2010/11. It enabled students who skipped the HKALE to enter the University of Hong Kong, the Chinese University of Hong Kong or the Hong Kong University of Science and Technology. Candidates who received 6 or more "A"s, attained level 4 or above in English Language and Chinese Language, or obtained "C" or above in French or Putonghua in the HKCEE, were eligible to take part in the scheme, which might grant them admission to the aforementioned institutions without requiring them to sit for the HKALE.

Only 400-500 candidates were eligible to join the scheme annually throughout the implementation of the scheme. Most of them would be admitted to university after they graduated from Form 6. Others, who were studying Form 7 and going to take the HKALE, were usually those who either failed to enrol on their preferred programme via the scheme, or planned to study abroad as some overseas universities may not accept admission applications with HKCEE result only.

Some students who were eligible to participate in the scheme, were once given an offer soon after the announcement of HKCEE results, thus allowing them to enter the university immediately rather than after completing Form 6. They were not classified as applicants of the scheme even though they were granted "Early Admissions", like other EAS applicants. Unlike the latter, those students were usually provided an extra year of bridging courses after they entered the university.

After the last HKCEE, which was held in 2010, the scheme was officially abolished.

== The scheme ==
By the number of actual intakes, the EAS is the biggest subsystem of JUPAS (roughly about 3-5% of total JUPAS intakes). It aims at providing flexibility to outstanding Secondary 6 students to be admitted to the three institutions participating in the scheme. Applicants must achieve the requirements in one sitting of the HKCEE or other qualifying examinations.

Applicants will be invited to information sessions held by the three participating universities on specific dates in order to help them in choosing the universities and programmes. On submission, applicants may select up to three programmes per university, making it a total maximum of nine programmes.

Applicants will then be invited to attend an interview by respective institutions. Usually only the first programme in the priority order of each institution will provide a subject-based interview but there are various exceptional cases. After the interviews applicants will receive feedbacks from the universities before they make their final choices.

A few weeks after the interviews, applicants will be required to draw up a final list of iteration. The list should consist of a maximum of 5 programmes. The programmes in the list are divided into two bands, with the programmes in the first two priority order being Band A and the other three being Band B. Successful applicants will only receive one offer which is the highest priority on their programme list.

Theoretically, to prevent domination in some popular "elite" programmes, hence causing unfairness to mainstream entrants, no programme should admit more the 1/3 EAS students to its total JUPAS intakes. An existence of such system made a few students may end up not being offered to their desired programme, though in most cases they will accept the less-desired offer.

== Views of Non-EAS students ==
=== Unfairness ===
There are more and more critics on the Scheme who believe imposes an unfairness to Form 7 students (especially to those who have obtained remarkable HKCEE results but could not achieve Level 4 or above in either one or both language subject(s), those who are unable show their talent to the maximum extent in the HKCEE or who do not excel academically but in other areas which are ignored by the scheme) who are required to sit for the HKALE which is much more difficult than the HKCEE.

=== Form 6 Study ===
Non-EAS students are likely to face huge pressure as the EAS students are often labelled as 'superior' whereas non-EAS students are categorised as 'inferior' or 'less able'. Non-EAS students have to face the HKALE, which is generally believed to be more tedious. Moreover, EAS entries are counted as entry by JUPAS but not direct admissions, which means, the mainstream applicant will have less chance entering certain programmes, especially programmes which are popular in EAS applicants, like Medicine.

Nevertheless, not all eligible students participated in the scheme. Students who left their original secondary schools and went studying in Hang Seng School of Commerce had to give up participating in this programme. On the contrary, students who went to PLK Vicwood KT Chong Sixth Form College were not required to make such sacrifice for quality education.

== Doubts in suitability for EAS students ==
The general public and many education experts criticise that HKCEE is not an appropriate examination for being a selection criteria of universities' admission procedure. Apart from this, the keen competition for places in the universities would extend to the HKCEE, and Form 5 students (HKCEE candidates) may encounter a high psychological pressure. It is also doubtful whether EAS-benefited students are mature enough to choose suitable university programmes which would probably determine their whole life. Adverse effect on EAS-benefited student (who have already seized places in the universities) learning in Form 6 would also be inevitable.

== See also ==
- Joint University Programmes Admissions System
- Education in Hong Kong
