= Electrical enclosure =

Cabinet for electrical or electronic equipment

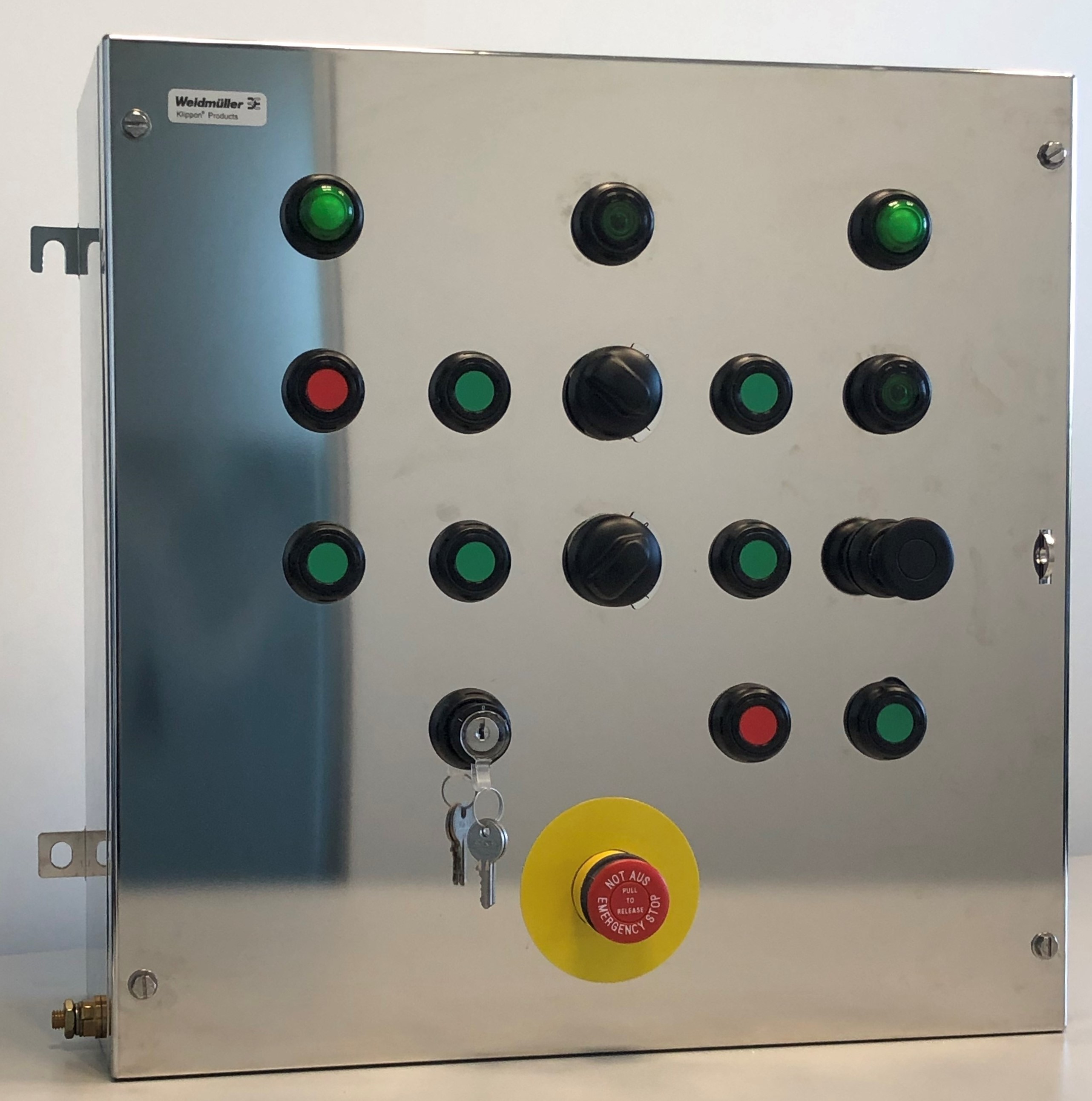
Electro polished enclosure (control station), explosion-proof

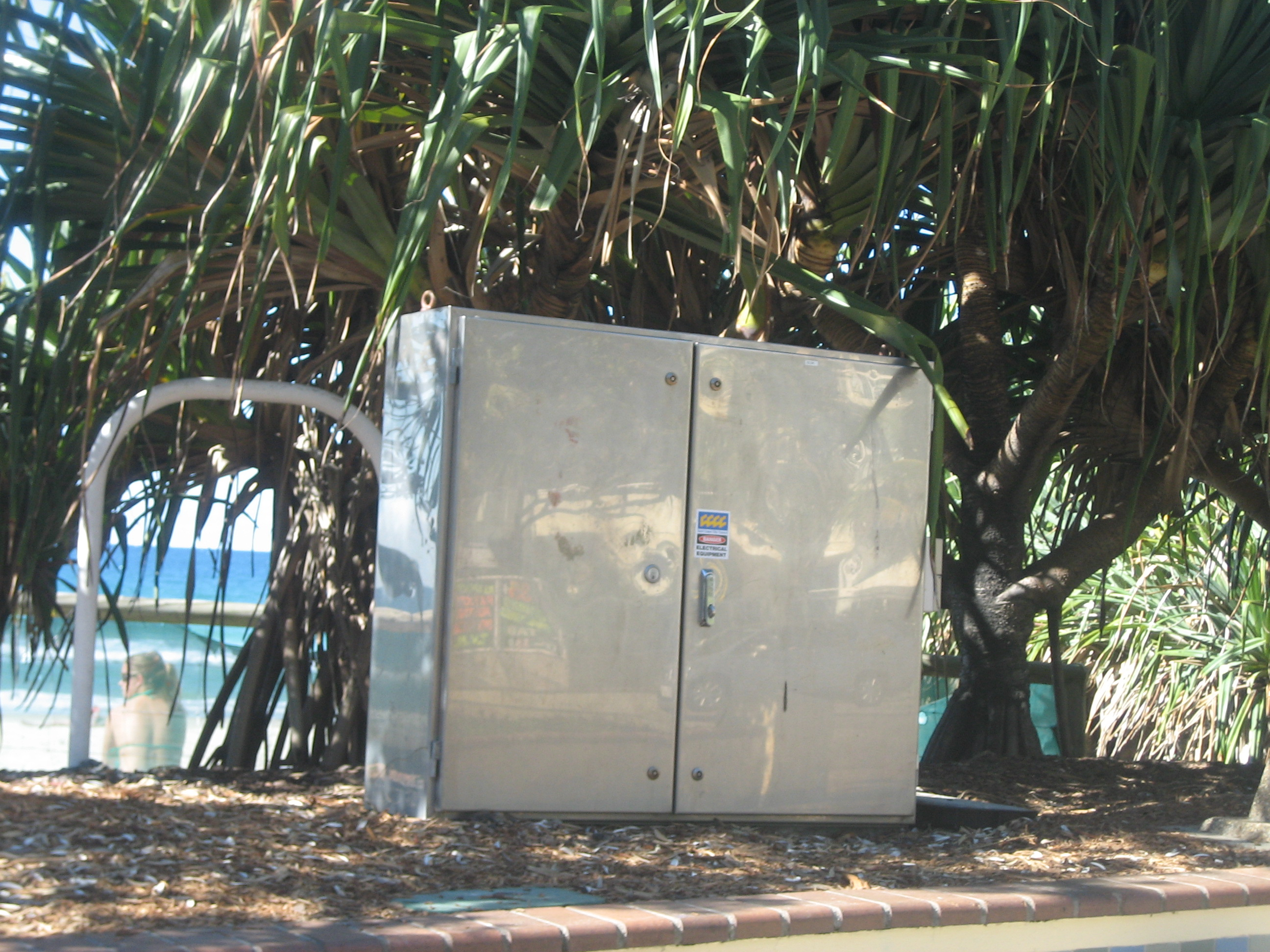
A municipal electrical enclosure

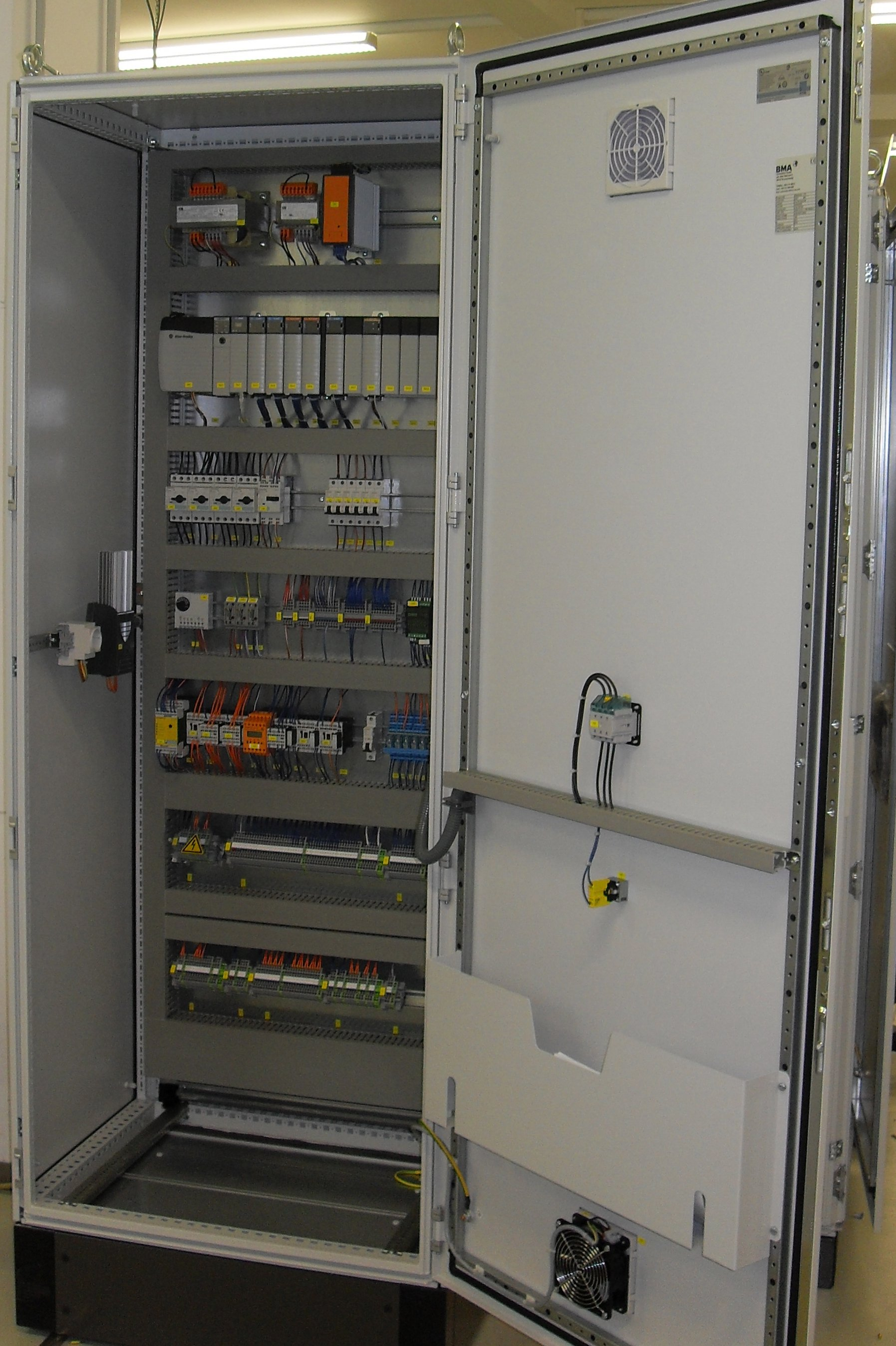
Allen Bradley programmable logic controller (PLC) installed in an electrical enclosure

An electrical enclosure, power box (US), or feeder pillar (UK), is a cabinet for electrical or electronic equipment to mount switches, knobs and displays and to prevent electrical shock to equipment users and protect the contents from the environment. The enclosure is the only part of the equipment which is seen by users. It may be designed not only for its utilitarian requirements, but also to be pleasing to the eye. Regulations may dictate the features and performance of enclosures for electrical equipment in hazardous areas, such as petrochemical plants or coal mines. Electronic packaging may place many demands on an enclosure for heat dissipation, radio frequency interference and electrostatic discharge protection, as well as functional, esthetic, and commercial constraints.

== Standards ==
Internationally, IEC 60529 classifies the IP Codes (ingress protection rating) of enclosures.

In the United States, the National Electrical Manufacturers Association (NEMA) publishes NEMA enclosure type standards for the performance of various classes of electrical enclosures. The NEMA standards cover corrosion resistance, ability to protect from rain and submersion, etc.

== Materials ==
Electrical enclosures are usually made from rigid plastics, or metals such as steel or stainless steel. Steel cabinets may be painted or galvanized. Mass-produced equipment will generally have a customized enclosure, but standardized enclosures are made for custom-built or small production runs of equipment. For plastic enclosures ABS is used for indoor applications not in harsh environments. Polycarbonate, glass-reinforced, and fiberglass boxes are used where stronger cabinets are required, and may additionally have a gasket to exclude dust and moisture.

Metal cabinets may meet the conductivity requirements for electrical safety bonding and shielding of enclosed equipment from electromagnetic interference. Non-metallic enclosures may require additional installation steps to ensure metallic conduit systems are properly bonded.

=== Stainless steel and carbon steel ===
Carbon steel and stainless steel are both used for enclosure construction due to their high durability and corrosion resistance. These materials are also moisture resistant and chemical resistant. They are the strongest of the construction options. Carbon steel can be hot or cold rolled. Hot rolled carbon steel is used for stamping and moderate forming applications. Cold rolled sheet is produced from low-carbon steel and then cold reduced to a certain thickness and can meet ASTM A366 and ASTM A611 requirements.

Stainless steel enclosures are suited for medical, pharma, and food industry applications since they are bacterial and fungal resistant due to their non-porous quality. Stainless steel enclosures may be specified to permit wash-down cleaning in, for example, food manufacturing areas.

=== Polycarbonate ===
Polycarbonate used for electrical enclosures is strong but light, non-conductive and non-magnetic. It is also resistant to corrosion and some acidic environments; however, it is sensitive to abrasive cleaners. Polycarbonate is the easiest material to modify.

=== Fiberglass ===
Fiberglass enclosures resist chemicals in corrosive applications. The material can be used over all indoor and outdoor temperature ranges. Fiberglass can be installed in environments that are constantly wet.

== Terminology ==
Enclosures for some purposes have partially punched openings (knock-outs) which can be removed to accommodate cables, connectors, or conduits. Where they are small and primarily intended to conceal electrical junctions from sight, or protect them from tampering, they are also known as junction boxes, street cabinets or technically as serving area interface.

== Telecommunications ==
Telecommunication enclosures are fully assembled or modular field-assembled transportable structures capable of housing an electronic communications system. These enclosures provide a controlled internal environment for the communications equipment and occasional craftspeople. The enclosures are designed with locks, security, and alarms to discourage access by unauthorized persons. Enclosures can be provided with a decorative facade to comply with local building requirements.

== Fire risk ==
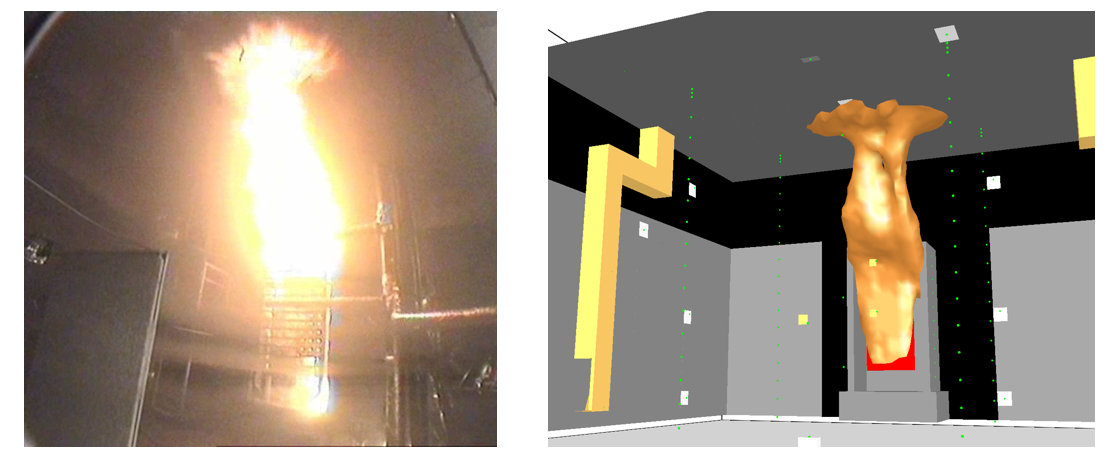
Fire of an electrical cabinet (left: photo, right: simulation with Fire Dynamics Simulator)

Electrical enclosures are prone to fires that can be very intense (in the order of the megawatt) and are hence an important topic of fire safety engineering.

== See also ==
- 19 inch rack
- Cable management
- DIN rail
- Housing (engineering)
- Rack unit
- Telco can
- Utility box art
- Utility vault
