= Subscriber loop carrier =

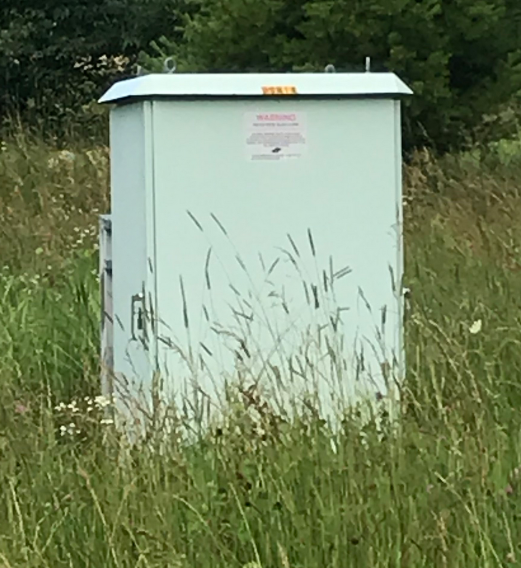
A rural SLC enclosure owned by TDS Telecom.

A subscriber loop carrier or subscriber line carrier (SLC) provides telephone exchange-like telephone interface functionality. SLC remote terminals are typically located in areas with a high density of telephone subscribers (such as a residential neighborhood), or very rural areas with widely dispersed customers, which are remote from the telephone company's central office (CO). Two or four T1 circuits (depending on the configuration) connect the SLC remote terminal to the central office terminal (COT), in the case of a universal subscriber loop carrier (USLC). An integrated subscriber loop carrier (ISLC) has its T-spans terminating directly in time division switching equipment in the telephone exchange.

One system serves up to 96 customers. This configuration is more efficient than the alternative of having separate copper pairs between each service termination point (the subscriber's location) and the central telephone exchange.

These systems are generally installed in cabinets that have some form of uninterruptible power supply or other backup battery arrangements, standby generators, and sometimes with additional equipment such as remote DSLAMs.

== Reliability ==
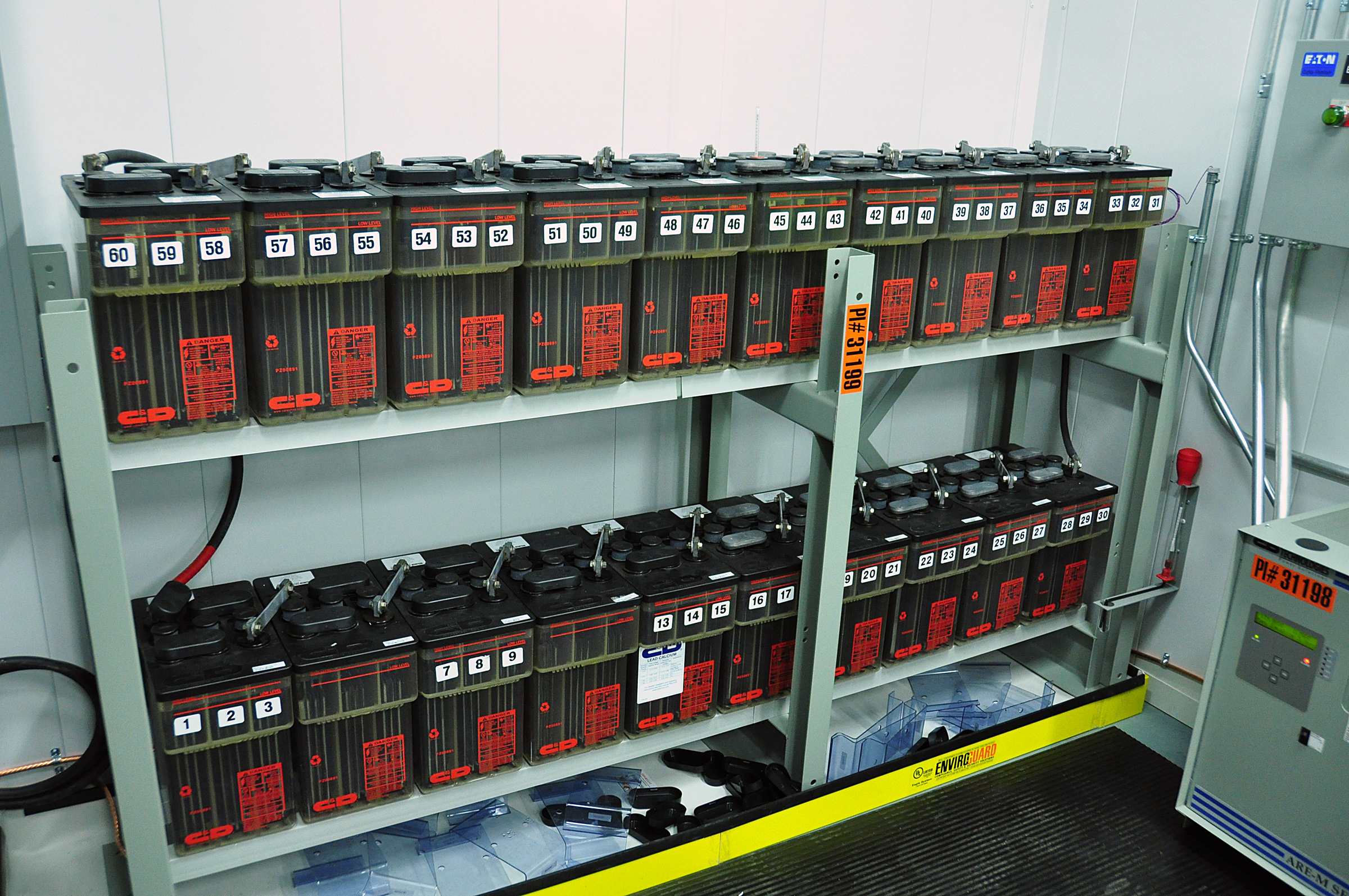
A typical central office (CO) lead-acid UPS setup.

SLCs have been criticized for reducing the reliability of local loops due to their increased reliance on utility power. Historically, all loop voltage was imposed directly by the CO via a 48V_{DC} lead-acid common battery system, with redundant diesel generators on standby to power the battery rectifiers in the event of an AC blackout. However, telephone companies have increasingly been using SLCs, which are notorious for poorly functioning or short-lived battery backup systems, some lasting as little as four hours. Many do not have on-site standby generators, thus the telephone company must bring out a portable generator before the battery power fails. This may not happen in time if there are obstructions caused by a natural or man-made disaster, or the generator may simply be stolen after deployment, causing service outages for anyone served by that unit. Often, the air conditioning units, sump pumps, and even lights are not backed up in those units, which can cause equipment overheating and flooding issues.

== See also ==
- Pair gain
- Distributed switching
- Digital loop carrier
- Telephone line
- Remote concentrator
