= Serving area interface =

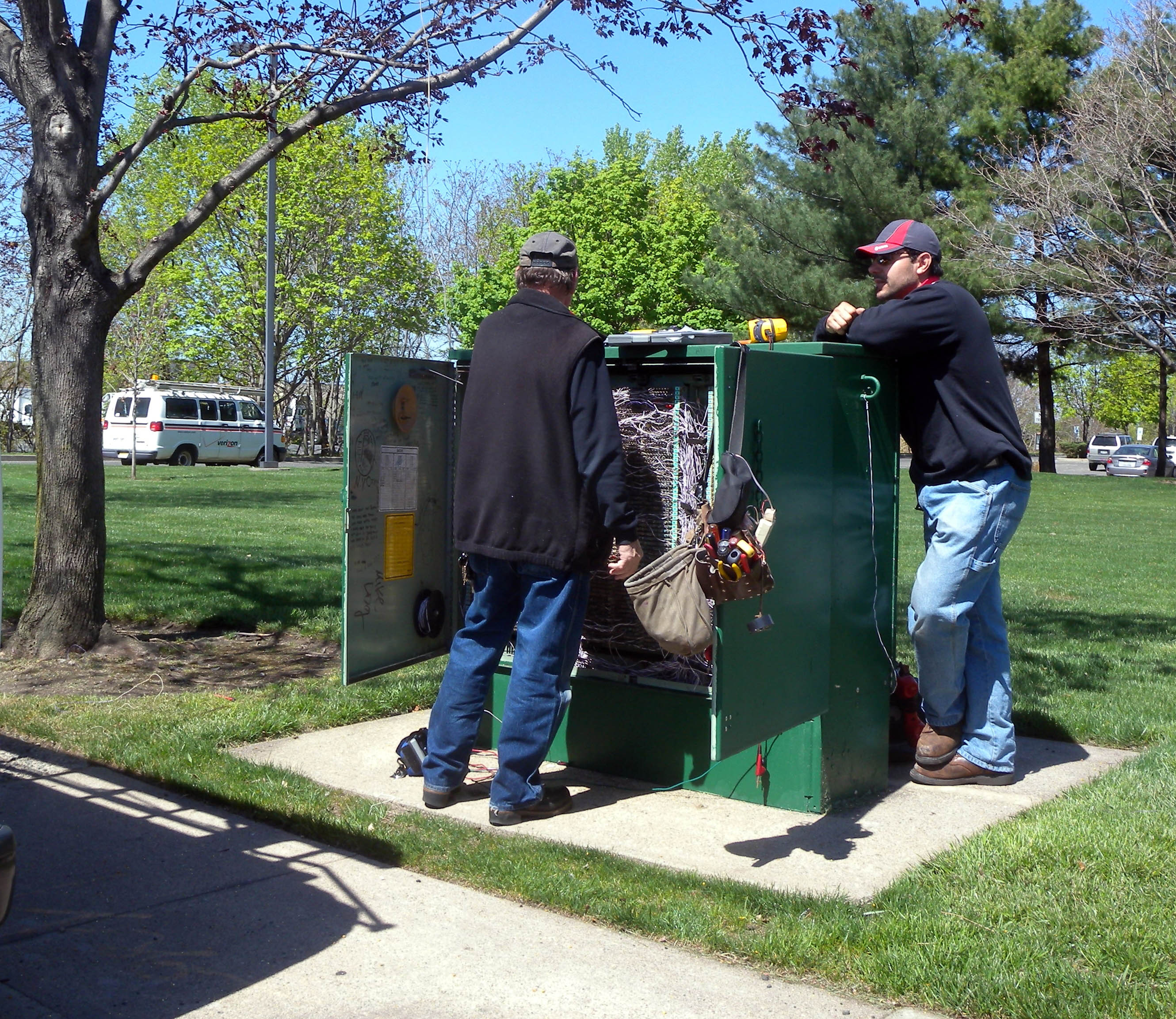
SAI in New Jersey

The serving area interface or service area interface (SAI) is an outdoor enclosure or metal box that allows access to telecommunications wiring.

== Alternate names ==
- Access point (AP)
- Cabinet (cab)
- B-box (breakout box)
- Cross box
- Cross-connect box
- Jumper wire interface (JWI)
- Outside plant interface (OPI)
- Pedestal (ped)
- Primary cross-connection point (PCP) (UK)
- Secondary cross-connection point (SCP) (UK)
- Telecom cabinet

== Function ==
The SAI provides the termination of individual twisted pairs of a telephony local loop for onward connection back to the nearest telephone exchange (US: "central office" (CO)) or remote switch, or first to transmission equipment such as a subscriber loop carrier multiplexer and then to the exchange main distribution frame (MDF).

In the United Kingdom, the components from the PCP onwards to the customer are known as "D-side" (distribution side), and from the PCP back to the MDF as the "E-side" (exchange side). In the United States, the connection back to the MDF is known as the F2 (secondary distribution cable) and/or the F1 (main feeder cable) pairs.

SAIs are used in suburban and low-density urban areas, serving some of the same purposes that manholes do in high-density urban areas. Besides a cross connect point, they sometimes contain a DSLAM or more rarely a remote concentrator or both.

== See also ==
- Demarcation point
- Enclosure (electrical)
- Fiber to the telecom enclosure
- Sub-loop unbundling
