= Extended area service =

Telephone service

Extended area service (EAS) is a telecommunication service by which telephone calls to certain points beyond the local calling area are not charged or not detail-billed. If the service is subscribed by a customer, other customers have no access to the benefit and are billed standard long-distance charges. The service may also be mandated for regulatory or technical reasons, and has been used in communities split by NPA boundaries when central office code protection was not available. The service may be flat rate, metered, or message-based.

The dialing procedures for extended area service are identical to other local calls to avoid customer confusion and the additional cost of implementing switching changes for the service.

The service implementation provided ambiguity and confusion in areas where long-distance calls had to be dialed by prefixing with the digit 1. In such cases AT&T recommended to rename the service as Expanded Metropolitan Area Calling, to avoid the term local service in customer instructions.

In Canada, EAS is still regulated by the CRTC, even though local service is subject to competition. In Canada, EAS is usually reflected as the appropriate monthly rate group for the number of lines that can be dialed toll-free - a small community gaining EAS with a large city usually means the large city's monthly rate applies to the small community. The rate alternately may be represented by a visible and separate charge, but is often much higher for the small community.

EAS in Canada is often selected by customers who request toll-free calling to a frequently-called nearby exchange. The carrier provides a ballot to customers in the two exchanges to determine whether the service is supported at the proposed increase in monthly rates. Any exchanges located between the two are included in the upgrade and reflected in the rate increase.

EAS is more common in areas with contiguous rural occupancy, and is rare for communities separated by undeveloped wilderness. It is usually driven by a common market or community interest, or the dependency of a small community on the larger one. Just as telephone company exchange areas do not correspond with municipal boundaries, not all areas of a large municipality may enjoy the same EAS area (the Lambeth exchange serving part of London, Ontario, does not have as many exchanges in its EAS area as the London exchange area).

EAS across an international border is rare, and is usually a relic of former common-ownership or a single exchange serving both communities. Surviving examples include Sweet Grass, MT - Coutts, AB (separate exchanges on the border); Stewart, BC - Hyder, AK (Hyder served by Stewart exchange); Estcourt Station, QC - Estcourt, ME (served by Estcourt Station exchange).
