= Loop around =

Telephone company test circuit

A loop line or loop around is a telephone company test circuit. The circuit has two associated phone numbers. When one side of the loop is called (side A), the caller receives a test tone of approximately 1000 Hz (milliwatt test). When the second number (side B) is called, it produces dead silence, but the party on side A hears the milliwatt test tone drop, and is connected to the person on side B. The purpose of the loop around test is to allow circuit testing to a distant central office without needing a person at the far end. The technician can send a tone down either line and measure the response tone on the second line to determine the path loss parameters.

When a line is connected to side A, multiple telephone lines, within limits, may connect to side B and thus be connected into a conference with the person on side A. The function of the tone on side A was to alert those already connected, when somebody called the B side and connected.

Teenagers discovered that the test facility could be used as so-called beep lines, in which they would dial up the primary number and wait for someone at random to call its mate. Phreaks would use the loop around in a similar manner, to exchange information that they had learned about the phone company.

Loop lines are far less common today than they were in the 1960s, however they reportedly continued to exist past the start of the 21st century.

Because of the potential for abuse, however, telephone companies seek to protect them. The most common protection techniques are:

- Filters that bandstop voice (these can be switched on or off)
- Recordings which make the line appear out of service
- Selective loop activation by operators
- Restrictions on which lines may call
- Using uncommon DTMF tones (A through D) in the telephone number

Eventually, telephone companies designed devices to prevent this misuse of the loop around. Some devices blocked the audio if frequencies other than the milliwatt tone were present, which thwarted the average abuser, but skilled violators discovered that playing a 1000 Hz tone while speaking softly, the suppression unit could be subverted, and a notch filter could be used while listening to remove the tone at the other end.

== See also ==
- Loopback
- Conference call
