= Local loop =

In telephony, the last part of the connection to the customer

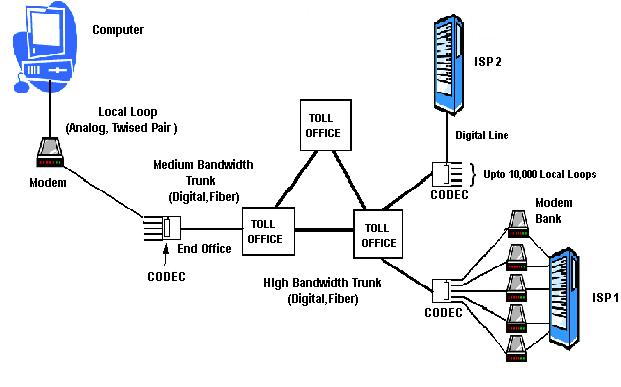
Local Loop

In telephony, the local loop (also referred to as the local tail, subscriber line, or in the aggregate as the last mile) is the physical link or circuit that connects from the demarcation point of the customer premises to the edge of the common carrier or telecommunications service provider's network.

At the edge of the carrier access network in a traditional public telephone network, the local loop terminates in a circuit switch housed in an incumbent local exchange carrier or telephone exchange.

== Infrastructure ==
Traditionally, the local loop was an electrical circuit in the form of a single pair of conductors from the telephone on the customer's premises to the local telephone exchange. Single-wire earth return lines had been used in some countries until the introduction of electric tramways from the 1900s made them unusable.

Historically the first section was often an aerial open-wire line, with several conductors attached to porcelain insulators on cross-arms on "telegraph" poles. Hence party line service was often given to residential customers to minimise the number of local loops required. Usually all these circuits went into aerial or buried cables with a twisted pair for each local loop nearer the exchange, see outside plant.

Modern implementations may include a digital loop carrier system segment or fiber optic transmission system. The local loop may terminate at a circuit switch owned by a competitive local exchange carrier and housed in a point of presence (POP), which typically is an incumbent local exchange carrier telephone exchange. A local loop supports voice and/or data communications applications in the following ways:

- analog voice and signaling used in traditional POTS
- Integrated Services Digital Network (ISDN)
- variants of digital subscriber line (DSL).

The term "local loop" is sometimes used for any "last mile" connection to the customer, regardless of technology or intended purpose. Local loop interrelations in this sense include:

- Electric power lines.
- Cable connections used with television, internet and telephone.
- Wireless signals or local loop (WLL): LMDS, WiMAX, GPRS, HSDPA, DECT
- Satellite connections for beamed signal.
- Optical or fiber optics services.

== See also ==
- Access network
- ISDN (Integrated Services Digital Network)
- Local-loop unbundling
- Metallic path facilities
- Outside plant (as an instance of a local loop)
- Serving area interface
- Telephone line
