= Apple II system clocks =

Early computer real-time clock devices

Apple II system clocks, also known as real-time clocks, were devices in the early years of microcomputing. A clock/calendar did not become standard in the Apple II line of computers until 1986 with the introduction of the Apple IIGS. Although many productivity programs as well as the ProDOS operating system implemented time and date functions, users would have to manually enter this information every time they turned the computer on. Power users often had their Apple II's peripheral slots completely filled with expansion cards, so third party vendors came up with alternative approaches with products like the Serial Pro and No-Slot Clock.

== No-Slot Clock (Dallas Semiconductor) ==
The No-Slot Clock, also known as the Dallas Smartwatch (DS1216E), was a 28-pin chip-like device that could be used directly in any Apple II or Apple II compatible with a 28-pin ROM. Dallas Semiconductor produced the device as an easy implementation for a real-time clock for a variety of applications. The clock was powered by an embedded lithium battery, electrically disconnected until power was first applied to retain freshness. The non-replaceable battery had a life expectancy of 10 years.

In an Apple II, the No-Slot Clock resided under any 28-pin ROM chip, including one on a peripheral card. A user had to remove the ROM from its socket, insert the No-Slot Clock, and then reinsert the ROM chip into the top of the No-Slot Clock. The No-Slot Clock was both ProDOS and DOS 3.3 compatible, however a software driver had to be patched into ProDOS or integrated into the applicable DOS 3.3 program. Once the driver was installed it emulated the Thunderclock. The No-Slot Clock was usually installed in the following locations on the motherboard in the following computers:

- Apple IIe: under the CD ROM (or CF ROM in later models)
- Apple IIc: under the Monitor ROM
- Apple IIc+: under the Monitor ROM
- Laser 128: under the ROM behind the metal cover on the bottom

== Serial Pro (Applied Engineering) ==
The Serial Pro was a multifunction serial interface and clock/calendar card from Applied Engineering. By combining the functions of two cards into one, the Serial Pro freed up an extra slot for those with highly populated machines. This card was unique in the sense that it did not use "Phantom Slots" to achieve this functionality. Previous multifunction cards required that a secondary function be "mapped" to a different slot in the computer's memory, rendering that slot unusable. The card was capable of a 12‑ and 24‑hour clock format, was both ProDOS and DOS 3.3 compatible, and had on-screen time and date setting built into its ROM, eliminating the need to run a program in order to set the time. The battery was a GE DataSentry rechargeable Ni-cad battery which had a lifespan rating of 20 years. The card retailed for $139 during the late 1980s.

For more on the Serial Pro's communication capabilities, see its entry in Apple II serial cards.

== Thunderclock Plus (Thunderware Incorporated) ==
When the Thunderware Thunderclock Plus was released in 1980, it quickly became the de facto standard for an Apple II system clock. When Apple Computer released its new ProDOS operating system in 1984, a Thunderclock software driver came built-in. From that point on, all new Apple II system clocks strived to emulate the Thunderclock. The card itself was more compact than the earlier "The Clock" from Mountain Computer and contained two battery holders for off the shelf alkaline batteries which were easily replaceable.

== TimeMaster H.O. (Applied Engineering) ==
The TimeMaster H.O. clock card from Applied Engineering was possibly the most advanced system clock ever designed for any Apple II. The card utilized an onboard VIA 6522 and was capable of emulating all other system clocks which preceded it. The TimeMaster H.O. was powered by a GE Datasentry rechargeable Ni-cad battery which had a lifespan rating of 20 years. It was capable of 24‑hour format or 12‑hour with AM/PM format, millisecond timekeeping with an accuracy of 0.00005%, and an onboard timer which could time down any interval up to 48 days. It also maintained an internal calendar, separate of the 7‑year cycle which ProDOS mapped. The TimeMaster H.O. was 100% ProDOS and DOS 3.3 compatible.

The "H.O." in TimeMaster H.O. stood for "High Output". This referred to the 8-pin Digital I/O port on the card for advanced applications. Through this port, one could hook up Applied Engineering's BSR X-10 interface and "command console" to remotely control lights and electrical appliances. The BSR system could send signals over existing 120‑volt wiring, eliminating the need for additional wires. The system could also be used for low‑voltage implementations. The TimeMaster H.O. retailed for $99 during the late 1980s while the BSR option cost an additional $29. The command console cost $39.

== Other system clocks ==
- AppleClock (Mountain Computer)
- California Computer Systems Clock (California Computer Systems)
- CPS Multifunction Card (Mountain Computer)
- The Clock (Mountain Computer)
- TimeMaster II H.O. (Applied Engineering)
- Hayes Stack Chronograph (Hayes Microcomputer Products)
- Time II (Applied Engineering)
- VersaCard (Prometheus Products)
- The Cricket! (Street Electronics)
- Clockworks (Micro Systems Research)
- SUPERCLOCK II (West Side Electronics)
- ProCLOCK (Practical Peripherals)
- N-Clock-Uhrkarte (Unknown)
- APPLE TimePiece (Comrex International)

== See also ==
- Apple II peripheral cards
