= Micro Center =

American computer retail store

- Type: Division
- Founded: 1979; 47 years ago, in Columbus, Ohio
- Founders: John Baker and Bill Bayne
- Headquarters: Hilliard, Ohio, U.S.
- Number of locations: 30 (2025)
- Key people: Richard M. Mershad (CEO); Peggy Wolfe (COO); Brad Kramer (CFO)
- Products: Computers, consumer electronics and accessories
- Revenue: $2.4 billion (2015)
- Number of employees: 2,750 (2016)
- Parent: Micro Electronics, Inc.
- Website: microcenter.com

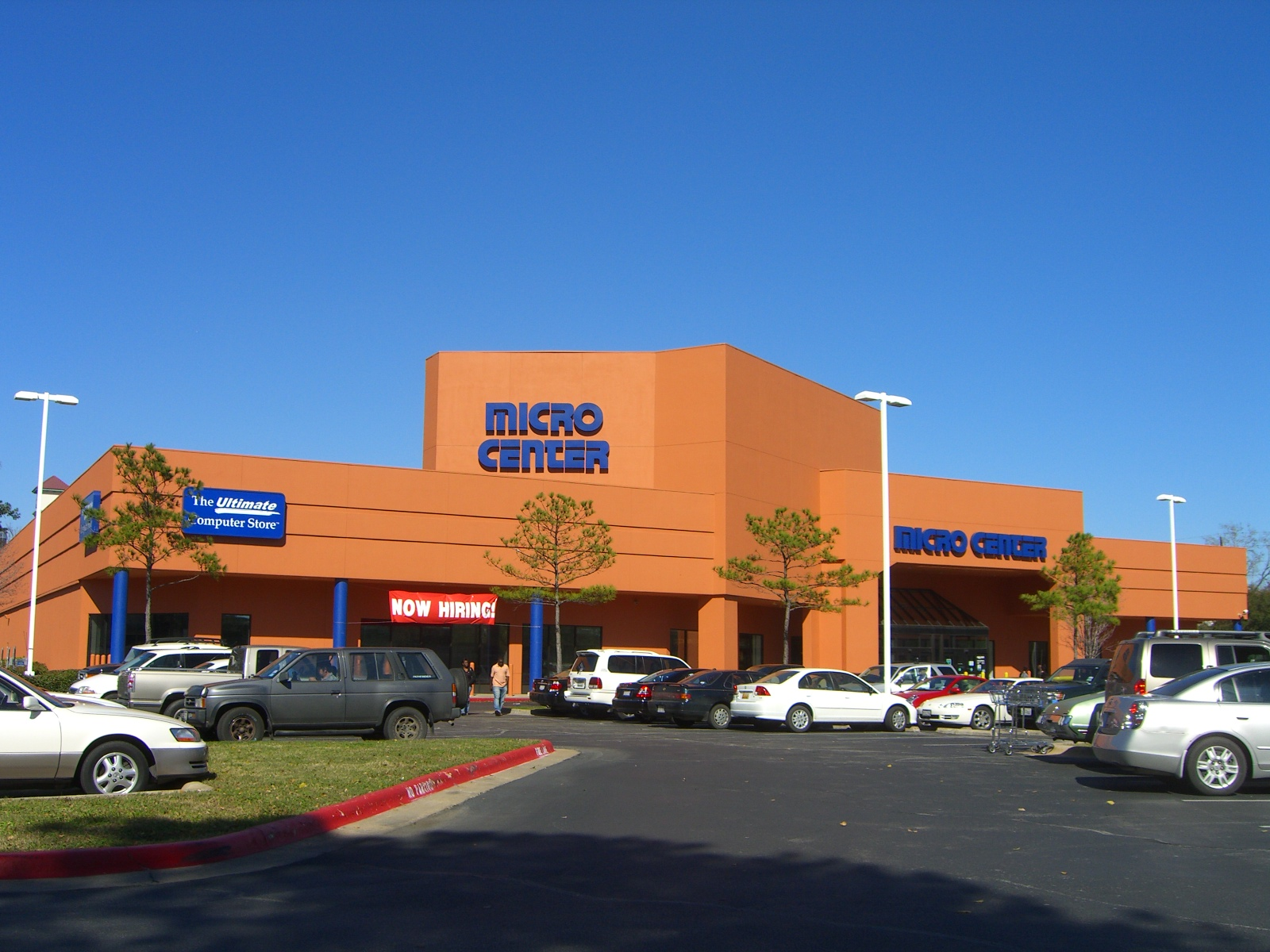
The former Micro Center store in Houston, Texas, which was replaced with a newly constructed 32,000 square foot store in 2015

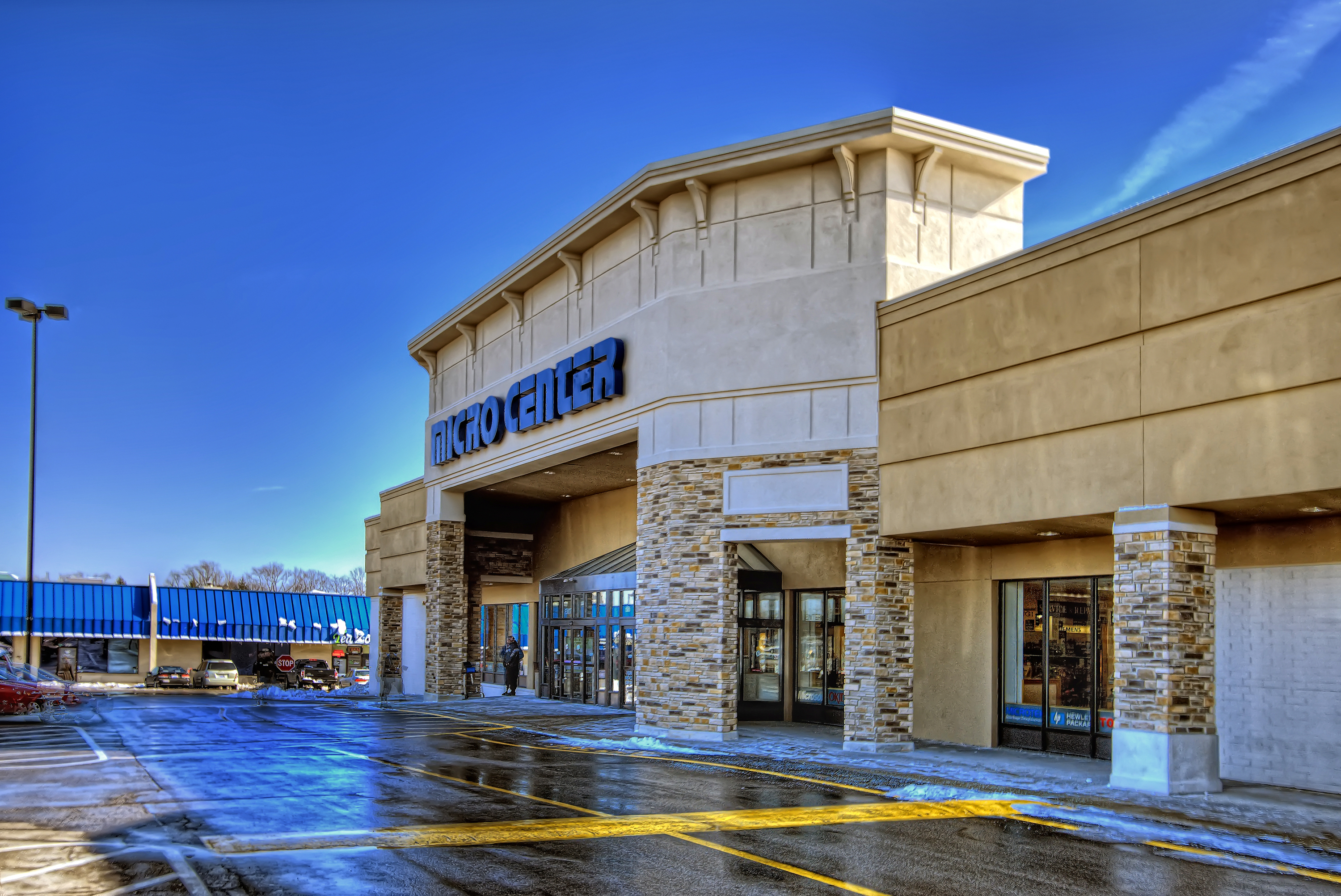
The Micro Center store in Columbus, Ohio

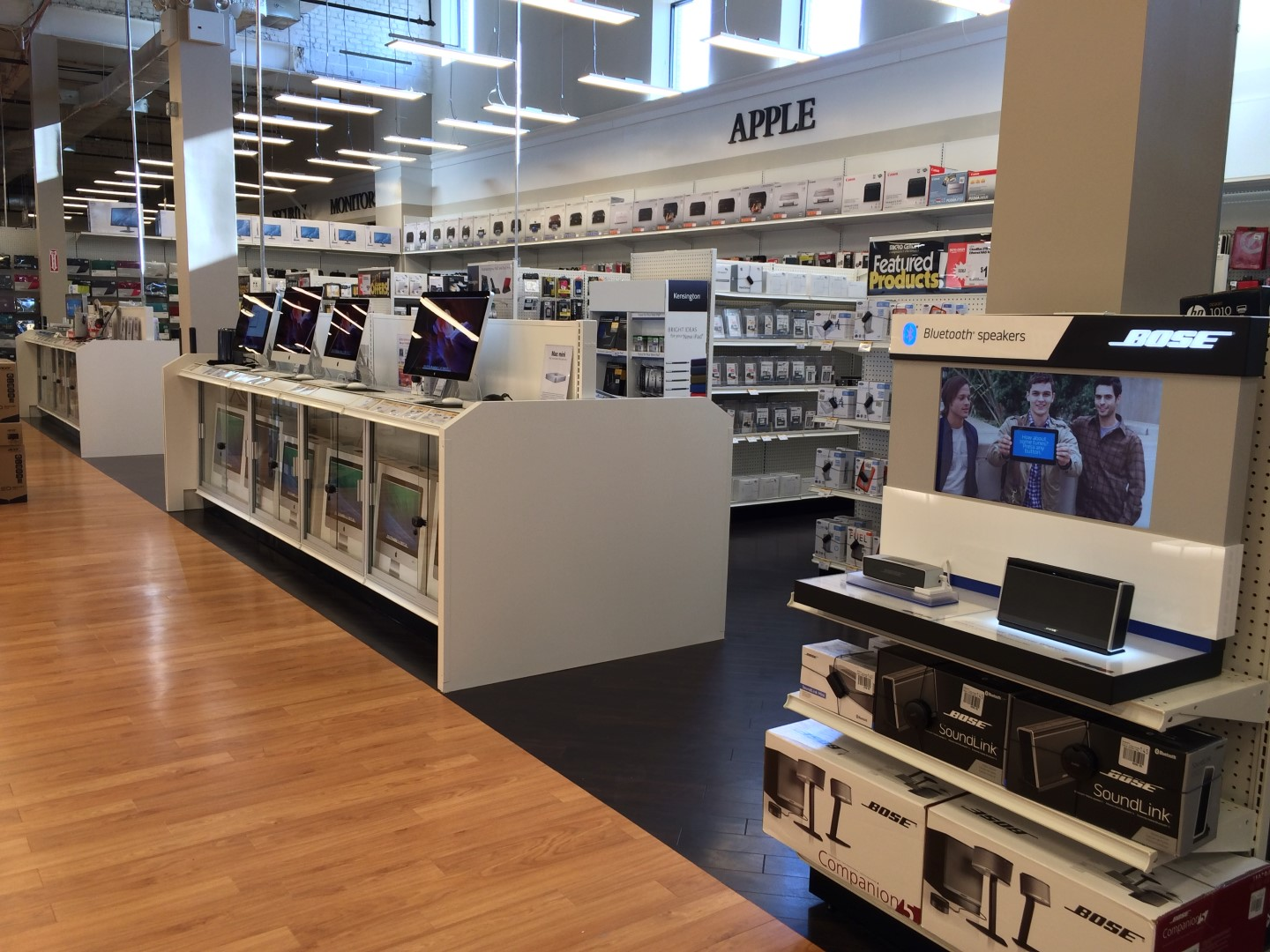
The Apple department in Micro Center Queens, New York

Micro Center is an American computer retail store chain, headquartered in Hilliard, Ohio. It was founded in 1979, and as of November 2025, has 30 stores in 20 US states.

== History ==
Micro Center was founded in Columbus, Ohio in 1979 by John Baker and Bill Bayne, two former Radio Shack employees, with a $35,000 investment. Rick Mershad is the current CEO and President of Micro Center. Mershad was one of the first 10 employees of the company, starting as a Sales Associate two years after the company's founding. The first Micro Center store was established in a 900 sq ft (84 m^{2}) storefront located in the Lane Avenue Shopping Center in Upper Arlington, Ohio. The store benefited from its proximity to Ohio State University and the scientific think-tank Battelle Memorial Institute, which provided a large customer base and a source of computer-literate salespeople. Their goal for the first year was $30 million in sales, and they achieved $29.9 million.

In the fall of 1997, Micro Center expanded into Silicon Valley by opening a store in Santa Clara, California. To compete against what was then the dominant computer retailer in California, Fry's Electronics, Micro Center stressed its better employee pay and superior customer service.

In 2009, Micro Center developed an "18-minute pickup" service where customers who order merchandise on their website can pick it up from the store in 18 minutes.

On July 23, 2012, Micro Center suddenly closed its Santa Clara store—its only one in Silicon Valley—after it was unable to negotiate a further extension of its store lease. By then, the store's front facade had already become a dated relic of the late 1990s, with long-obsolete logos from Hayes, USRobotics, Practical Peripherals, Lotus Development, and Fujifilm. A new store opened on May 30, 2025 in a different Santa Clara location formerly occupied by a Bed Bath & Beyond. The new store was welcomed as filling a significant "void" in Silicon Valley, since the 2021 closure of Fry's had left Best Buy as the only big-box electronics store chain in the area.

In January 2014, the company opened new New York City stores in Brooklyn and Queens.

As of May 2025, there are 30 Micro Center stores nationwide in 20 states, including Arizona, California, Colorado, Florida, Georgia, Illinois, Indiana, Kansas, Maryland, Massachusetts, Michigan, Minnesota, Missouri, New Jersey, New York, North Carolina, Ohio, Pennsylvania, Texas, and Virginia. The chain opened their 30th store in Phoenix, Arizona on November 7, 2025.

== Corporate structure ==
Micro Center is a subsidiary of Micro Electronics, Inc., a privately held corporation headquartered in Hilliard, Ohio.

Stores are sized up to 60,000 sq ft (5,600 m^{2}), stocking about 36,000 products across 700 categories, including major name brands and Micro Center's own brands. Micro Center is an approved seller of all Apple products. The company has had Apple departments in all stores since 1982, and has included "Build Your Own PC" departments, and "Knowledge Bars" for service and support since 2007.

== Public profile ==
Micro Center was the first retailer in the United States to sell the DJI Mavic Pro drone, launching it by hosting a three-day demonstration in their Columbus store's parking lot which was open to the press and the public.

In 2012, Charles Crawford acquired a 25% ownership stake in Micro Center as part of an initiative to expand the company's retail presence into Canada, particularly in Quebec. Following the investment, Crawford established Micro Byte in 2012 as a Canadian retail and technology operation associated with the expansion of the Micro Center brand. Crawford had also established Micro Jeux in 2009, focusing on video games, gaming hardware, and related consumer electronics.

In a 2015 interview, Micro Center CEO Rick Mershad described how their product line is changing: the STEM movement is driving students and adults to make their own creations, and Micro Center is focusing on Arduino projects and Raspberry Pi, which require more consultative selling.

=== Media reception ===
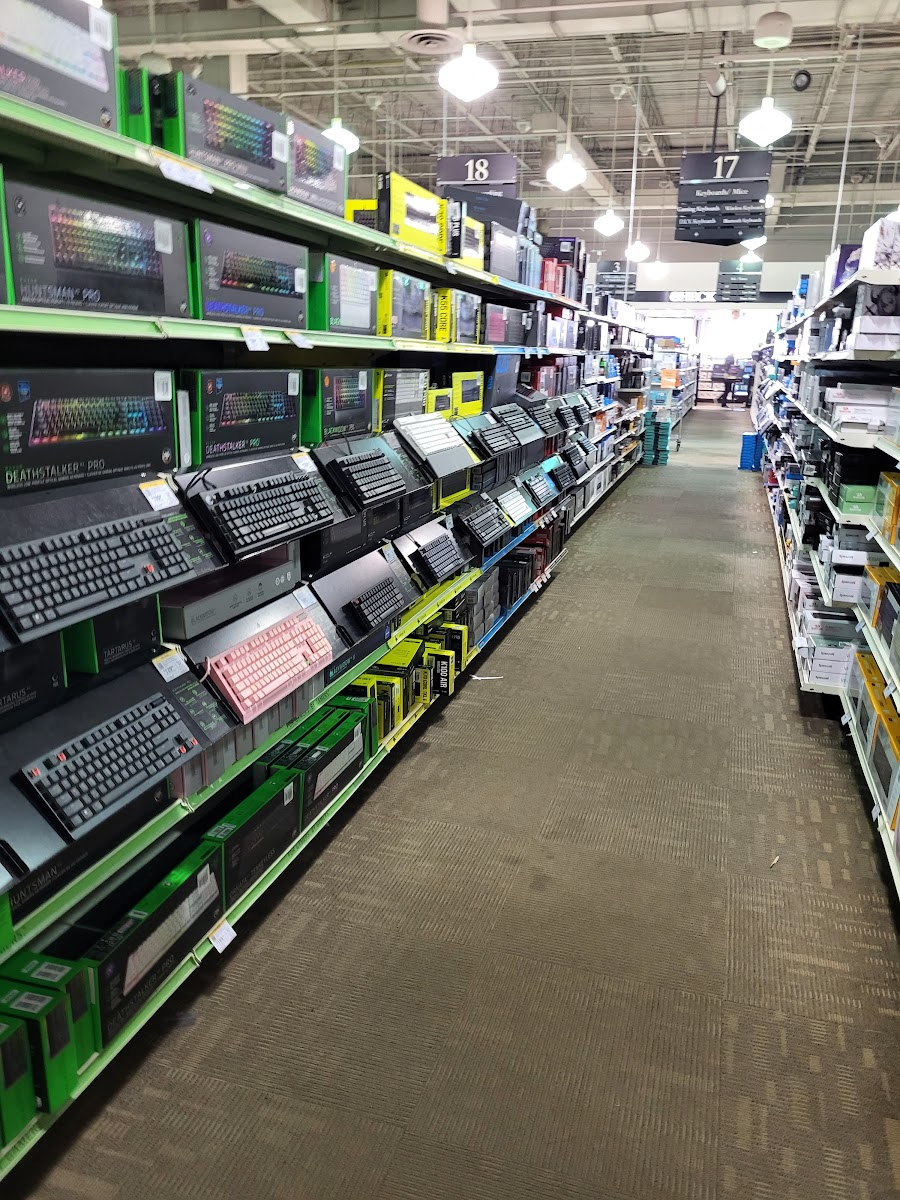
Micro Center Keyboard Aisle in Vienna, Virginia

Joan Verdon of The Record noted that meeting customer's needs with a high level of service and skilled salespeople are Micro Center's "claim to fame". She also quoted Doug Olenick, editor at TWICE, a major consumer electronics trade publication, who said that the store's salespeople, compared to others in the industry, are extremely well trained.

In 2021, the store started to offer a free solid-state drive to new customers, but Storage Review was not impressed, concluding "it's free, but it's still not worth it". More generally, they noted that: "Micro Center's Inland brand is to tech what Amazon's dozens of brands are to toilet paper, shampoo, and such."

== Awards and rankings ==
In 2014, Micro Center was ranked 93rd on a list of the 100 hottest retailers in the United States compiled by the National Retail Federation.

In 2015, the industry trade journal Dealerscope ranked it as the 18th largest consumer electronics retailer in the United States and Canada.

In 2016, Forbes magazine ranked it 195th among America's largest private companies.

In October 2016, Micro Center stores won first and second prizes in Intel's annual "Score with Intel Core" competition, and donated their prize money to local schools. In 2019, Micro Center stores won first and third prizes, making two more prize money donations to local schools.

== See also ==
According to the American business research company Hoover's, the major competitors to Micro Center's parent company Micro Electronics are:

- Best Buy
- PC Connection
- Amazon.com
