= Apple II serial cards =

Computer hardware

Apple II serial cards primarily use the serial RS-232 protocol. They most often were used for communicating with printers, modems, and less often for computer to computer data transfer. They can be programmed to interface with any number of external devices which were RS-232 compatible. Most serial cards have speed ranges starting from 110 bit/s up to 19,200 bit/s, however some can be modified to go much faster. The most popular and widely used of these cards was Apple Computer's Super Serial Card, a solid design that was often copied for maximum software compatibility of the end product.

== Apple II Communications Card (Apple Computer) ==
The Apple II Communications Card is the original serial card from Apple Computer. Released in 1978 for $225, it was designed to work with modems utilizing acoustic couplers. It offered speeds of 110 and 300 bit/s but with a simple hardware modification (described in the manual accompanying the card) one could change this to 300 and 1200 bit/s, or 1200 and 4800 bit/s.

== Apple II Serial Interface Card (Apple Computer) ==
The Apple II Serial Interface Card was released by Apple Computer shortly after the Communications Card, in August 1978. Designed for printing, this card had ROM revisions, P8 and P8A. The P8A ROM supported handshaking, whereas the earlier P8 ROM didn't. The P8A ROM revision was not compatible with some printers that worked under the original P8 ROM.

== Serial Pro (Applied Engineering) ==
The Serial Pro serial interface card from Applied Engineering was compatible with the Apple Super Serial Card. Unlike the Apple SSC, which used a jumper block to select printer mode or modem mode, the Serial Pro board had two connectors to which the card's ribbon cable could be connected, one for use with a printer and one for use with a modem.

The Serial Pro was a multifunction card which included a ProDOS and DOS 3.3 compatible clock/calendar, freeing up an extra slot for those with highly populated machines. This card was unique in the sense that it did not use "Phantom Slots" to achieve this functionality. Previous multifunction cards required that a secondary function be "mapped" to a different slot in the computer's memory, rendering that slot unusable.

If used with a dot-matrix printer, the Serial Pro offered several screen-print variations. It could print either HiRes page (or both in a single dump) normally, or print page one rotated or inverted.

The Serial Pro utilized the MOS Technology 6551 ACIA chip and offered serial baud rates from 50 bit/s to 19,200 bit/s. The lifespan of the card's battery (which retained configuration information and powered the clock chip when the computer was powered off) was touted as 20 years. The card retailed for $139 during the late 1980s.

== Super Serial Card (Apple Computer) ==
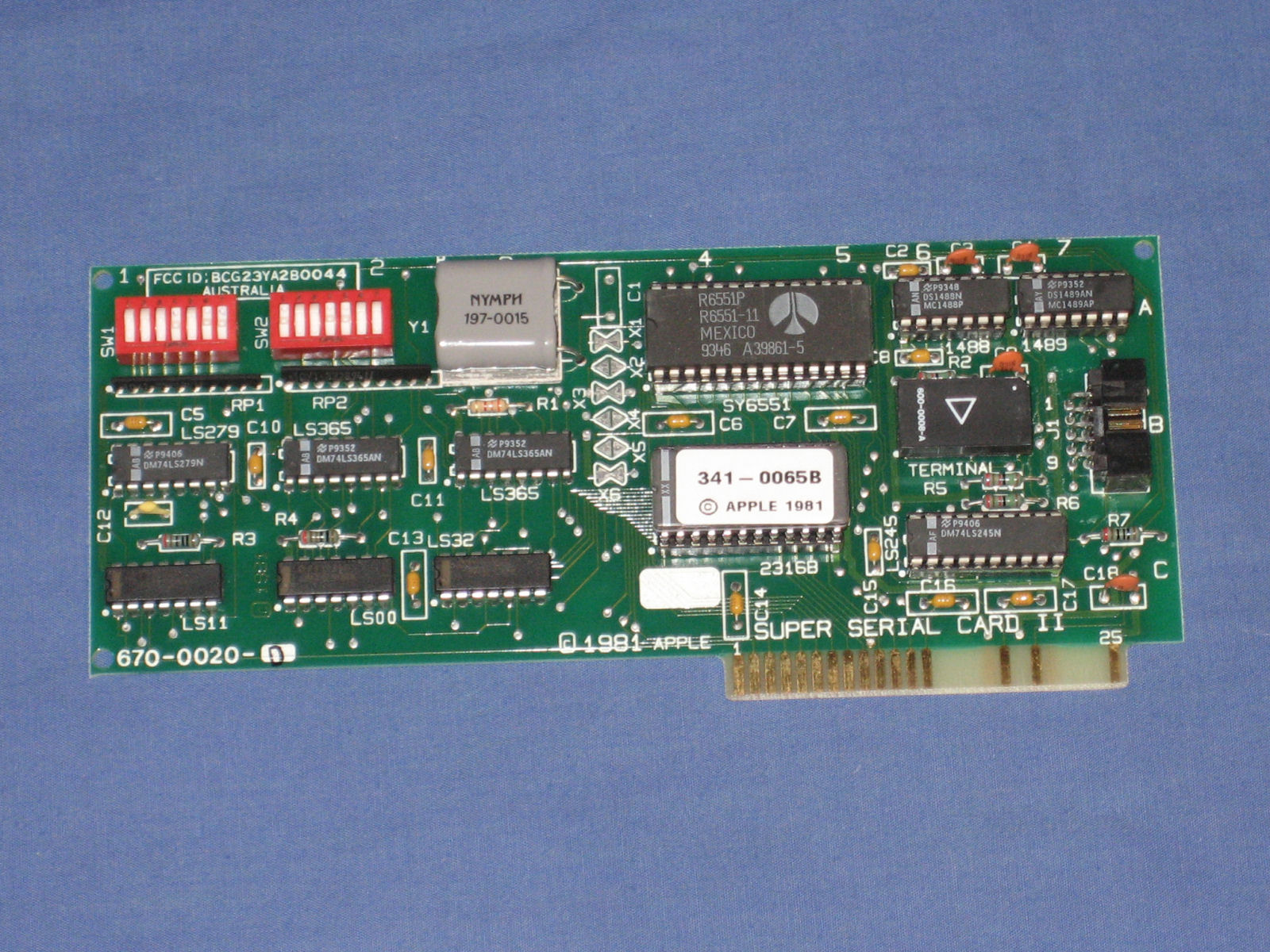
The Super Serial Card

Apple Computer's Super Serial Card, sometimes abbreviated as "SSC", is the most well known communication card made for the Apple II. Apple called it "Super" because it was able to function as both of Apple's previous cards, the Apple II Communications Card for modem use and the Apple II Serial Interface Card for printer use. A jumper block was used to configure the card for each of the two modes. The card has a maximum speed of 19,200 bit/s and is compatible with both ROM revisions of the Apple II Serial Interface Card. Reliable communications at 9600 bit/s and higher required disabling of interrupts. The card can actually run at 115,200 bit/s as well, using undocumented register settings; but speeds between 19,200 and 115,200 are not possible using this technique. The Super Serial Card was released in 1981 and utilizes the MOS Technology 6551 ACIA serial communications chip.

== Other serial cards ==
- 7710 Serial Interface – California Computer Systems
- 7711 Super Serial Interface – California Computer Systems
- AIO Interface – SSM or Transend
- ASIO Interface – SSM or Transend
- Alphabits – Street Electronics
- Serial Interface – Apricorn
- Multicore – Quadram
- SV-622 Serial Interface – Microtek
- SeriALL – Practical Peripherals
- Serial Interface DK 244 – Digitek International Ltd
- Super Serial Board – MC Price Breakers – Generic Super Serial Card clone
- Super Serial Imager – Apricorn
- Super-COMM – Sequential Systems – SSC compatible, built in term program in ROM, supported grappler screen dumps and graphics.
- Versacard – Prometheus Products Inc.
- MasterCard II – Pace electronics. 6850 based serial port with a 6522 user port to drive autodial modems. Simple terminal program included in onboard EPROM

== See also ==
- Apple II peripheral cards
