= MOS Technology 6551 =

Integrated circuit made by MOS Technology

The 6551 Asynchronous Communications Interface Adapter (ACIA) is an integrated circuit made by MOS Technology. It served as a companion UART chip for the widely popular 6502 microprocessor. Intended to implement RS-232, its specifications called for a maximum speed of 19,200 bits per second with its onboard baud-rate generator, or 125 kbit/s using an external 16x clock. The 6551 was used in several computers of the 1970s and 1980s, including the Commodore PET and Plus/4. It was also used by Apple Computer on the Apple II Super Serial Card, and by Radio Shack on the Deluxe RS-232 Program Pak for their TRS-80 Color Computer.

Several companies, including Dr. Evil Labs and Creative Micro Designs, marketed an add-on cartridge containing a 6551 and an industry-standard RS-232 port to allow the C64 and 128 to use high-speed modems from companies such as USRobotics and Hayes Communications. The Dr. Evil and CMD cartridges pushed the 6551 to 38,400 baud and, with a faster-still clock crystal, some end users reported getting 115,200 bit/s from the 6551. The ADTPro file transfer program disables the baud rate generator in the 6551, allowing 115,200 bit/s transfers with an unmodified clock crystal.

== Variants ==
The Rockwell 65C52 combines two CMOS 6551s on a chip.

== Similar chips ==
The Motorola 6850 is a similar chip to the MOS Technology 6551, but without an onboard bit rate generator. The 6850 is often used for MIDI.

The Western Design Center WDC 65C51 is designed as a drop in replacement for the original MOS 6551, electrically, physically and programming- compatible with most 6551 and 6850 derivatives from most other suppliers. The WDC 65C51 has errata, in which the transmitter “ready” bit is “stuck” in the ready state.
