= Applied engineering =

Applied engineering may refer to:

- Applied engineering (field), a professional field combining management, design, and technical skills
- Applied Engineering, a hardware vendor for the Apple II series of computers
