= ACIA =

ACIA may refer to:

- Arctic Climate Impact Assessment, a study
- Asynchronous Communications Interface Adapter, integrated circuits like MOS6551 and MC6850
- American Committee for Armenian Independence, an early 20th-century support organization
- ASEAN Comprehensive Investment Agreement, an international agreement

== See also ==
- Açaí palm, of which the Açaí Berry is the fruit
