= Zoom Technologies =

Zoom Technologies may refer to:

- Zoom Video Communications Inc., an American software company which developed the Video conferencing software Zoom
- ZoomInfo Technologies Inc., a Vancouver based Software as Service company
- Zoom Corporation, a Japanese audio company
- Zoom Telephonics, a Boston-based manufacturer of networking equipment
