= Cardinal Technologies =

American computer company

Cardinal Technologies, Inc.
- Type: Public
- Industry: Computer
- Founded: February 1987; 39 years ago
- Founder: Harold Krall
- Defunct: March 1997; 29 years ago
- Fate: Acquired by Hayes Microcomputer Products
- Products: Modems; Sound cards; Computer systems
- Number of employees: 220 (1993, peak)
- Parent: Vulcan Inc. (50.35%)

Cardinal Technologies, Inc., was an American computer company originally based in Lancaster, Pennsylvania, that primarily manufactured modems for personal computers, among other peripherals.

== History ==
Cardinal Technologies was founded in February 1987 by Harold Krall and seven other ex-employees of the RCA Corporation's New Products Division research and development office and factory in Lancaster, Pennsylvania. In 1986, General Electric completed its acquisition of the ailing RCA Corporation, divesting RCA's New Products Division—which had incubated and produced many of the company's ideas for consumer electronics, by selling it to—Thomson S.A. of France. In 1987, Krall and several of his colleagues from RCA bartered for the acquisition of the Lancaster plant, its equipment, and associated liabilities from General Electric and Thomson S.A. for $4 million. The colleagues incorporated Cardinal Technologies from this plant, which was to be their break into the fast-growing personal computer market of the late 1980s, which GE and RCA had largely ignored. Krall and company planned for Cardinal to manufacture complete computer systems from the onset but started small by manufacturing modems for personal computers.

Cardinal offered modems both external, housed in plastic chassis sat beside the computer, and internal, attached to a computer's internal expansion slot. The company became a major player in the field within three years of its incorporation, helped along by OEM contracts with major computer systems brands. By the early 1990s, the company also produced graphics cards, keyboards, and monitors. In late 1990, the company introduced their first line of personal computer systems, called the PC 10, an IBM PC compatible based on the i386 and i386SX processors and intended to compete with IBM's PS/1 and Apple's Macintosh. In 1991, Cardinal partnered with Fujifilm to develop the Cardinal SnapPlus, an expansion card for IBM PCs and compatibles that acted as a both a character generator and chroma keyer for superimposing digital graphical and textual elements over a videotape feed generated from the computer back onto tape. It also allowed for computers to import photographs from Video Floppy disks taken by early electronic cameras, such as those Fujifilm had produced in the 1980s and 1990s.

Cardinal turned its first profit in 1990, earning $600,000 on sales of $33 million. Employment numbers at the company's Lancaster headquarters hovered between 200 and 220 workers from 1991 to 1993. The company broke even in profits in 1991 and posted a loss in 1992. Its stature in the modem arena continued to grow however, Cardinal becoming the second largest manufacturer of fax modems in the United States in 1992, trailing Intel.

In September 1993, Paul Allen, co-founder of Microsoft, invested $15 million into Cardinal by way of his Vulcan company, representing a stake of just under 20 percent of the company. Between February and March 1994, Krall and two other co-founders were ousted from the board of directors and 31 management and factory employees were laid off, shortly after the company posted another loss for 1993. This round of layoffs was enacted by executives at Vulcan who intended to restructure the company, increasing its development budget and investing in newer manufacturing equipment while making the company's production schedule and payroll leaner. In August 1994, Vulcan increased their stake in Cardinal to 50.35 percent after accusing Cardinal of overstating its value in documentation presented to Vulcan before September 1993's stock sale. The company thereafter focused only on the production of multimedia sound cards and modems.

In March 1997, Hayes Microcomputer Products, another major modem manufacturer, announced that it would acquire Cardinal for an undisclosed sum, shutting down Cardinal's Lancaster plant and consolidating its assets into Hayes.
