= Dennis Hayes (businessman) =

Founder of Hayes Microcomputer Products

Dennis C. Hayes
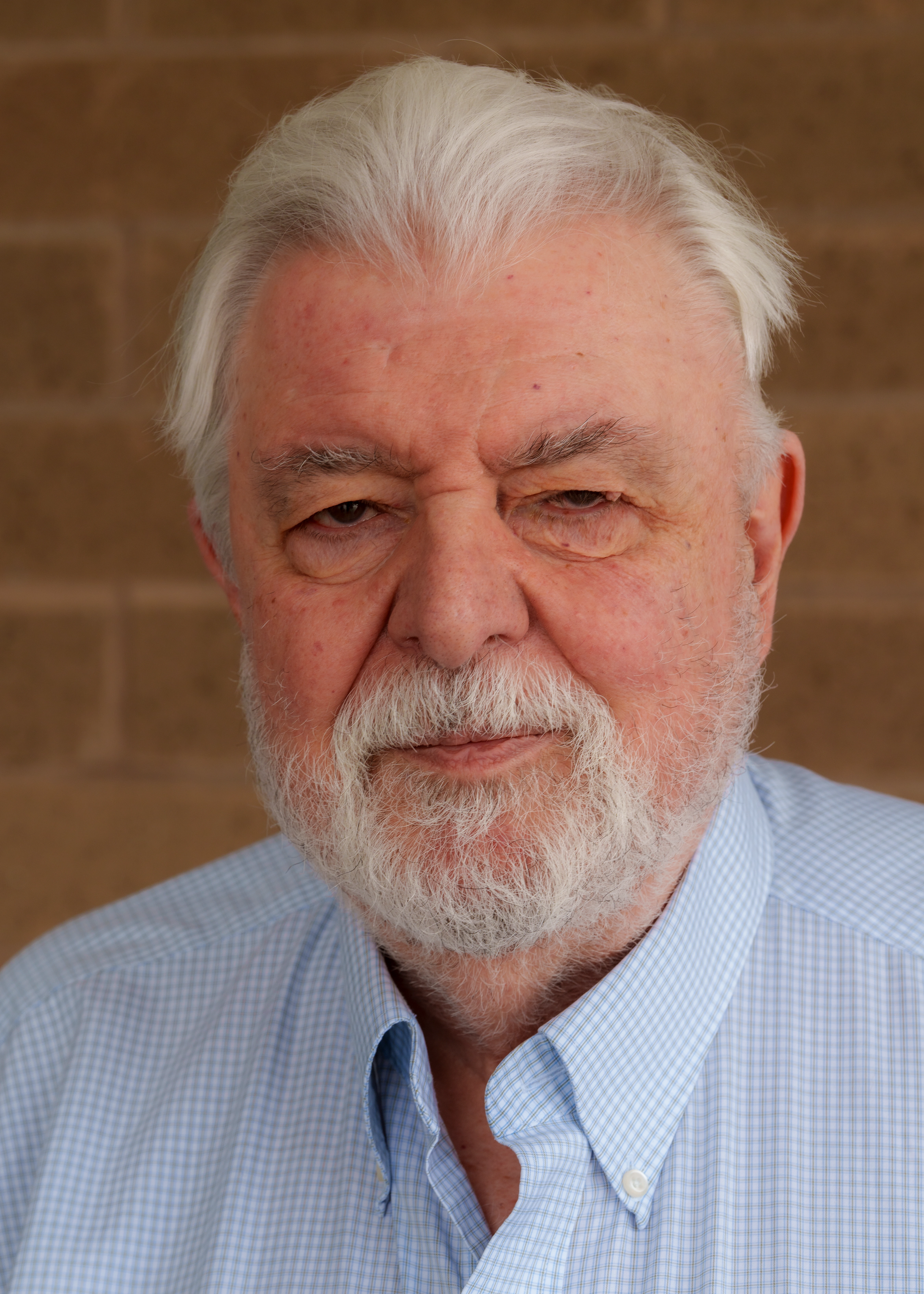
- Hayes in 2026
- Born: 1950 (age 75–76)
- Education: Georgia Institute of Technology
- Occupation: Inventor
- Known for: Creating Hayes command set; Founding Hayes Microcomputer Products

Dennis C. Hayes (born 1950) is the inventor of PC modem and founder of Hayes Microcomputer Products, a manufacturer of modems mostly known for introducing the Hayes AT command set, which has subsequently been used in most modems produced to this day.

== Background ==
Hayes had a student job at AT&T Long Lines, in an engineering group, while attending Georgia Institute of Technology.

He left Georgia Tech in the mid-1970s to work at an early data communications company, National Data Corporation in Atlanta, a company that handled electronic money transfers and credit card authorizations. Hayes's job was to set up modem connections for NDC's customers. In 1977, Hayes started his company "by assembling modems by hand on a borrowed kitchen table." He met Dale Heatherington at National Data Corporation and together they developed and marketed the first high-quality IBM PC modem, and built the company named Hayes Communications around it. While Heatherington left the company early (in 1985) to retire, Hayes ran the company until it filed for bankruptcy in 1998 when the technology was incorporated into the products of competitors.

In 1994, Hayes's share of the modem market was 20% and still "the market leader in modems", but a decline in relation to its previous market share of over 50%.

== Personal life ==
In 1982, Hayes married Melita Easters. They divorced in 1987 with an estimated $40 million divorce settlement, one of the largest ever in Georgia. The same year of his divorce, Hayes married Mina Chan with whom, according to Georgia Trend magazine, he had an affair in 1986 while still married to Easters. Chan was a director of Hayes's company. From two marriages he has four children.
