= Dale Heatherington =

American electrical engineer and computer scientist (born 1948)

- Born: 1948
- Died: 2021 (aged 72–73)
- Education: Electrical engineering
- Alma mater: Southern Polytechnic State University
- Occupations: Electrical engineer Computer scientist
- Known for: Development of Hayes Microcomputer Products

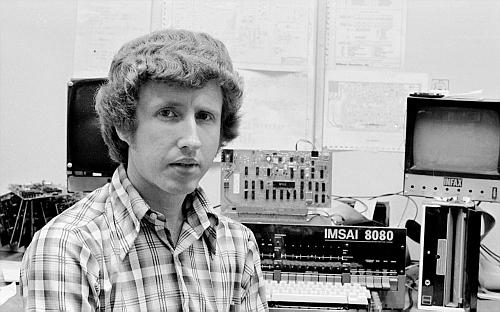
Heatherington with the prototype Hayes 80-103A

Dale Heatherington (1948 – 2021) was an American electrical engineer and computer scientist best known for helping Dennis C. Hayes in the development of Hayes Microcomputer Products, the company that pioneered the Hayes modem and the Hayes command set.

Although a southern newspaper described him as "just a multimillionaire who likes tracking his cat with a homemade radio transmitter", Heatherington's career went beyond the modem company, including work in the area of game robots. Funding for his robotics can be traced to having "had his name on all the important patents."

== History ==
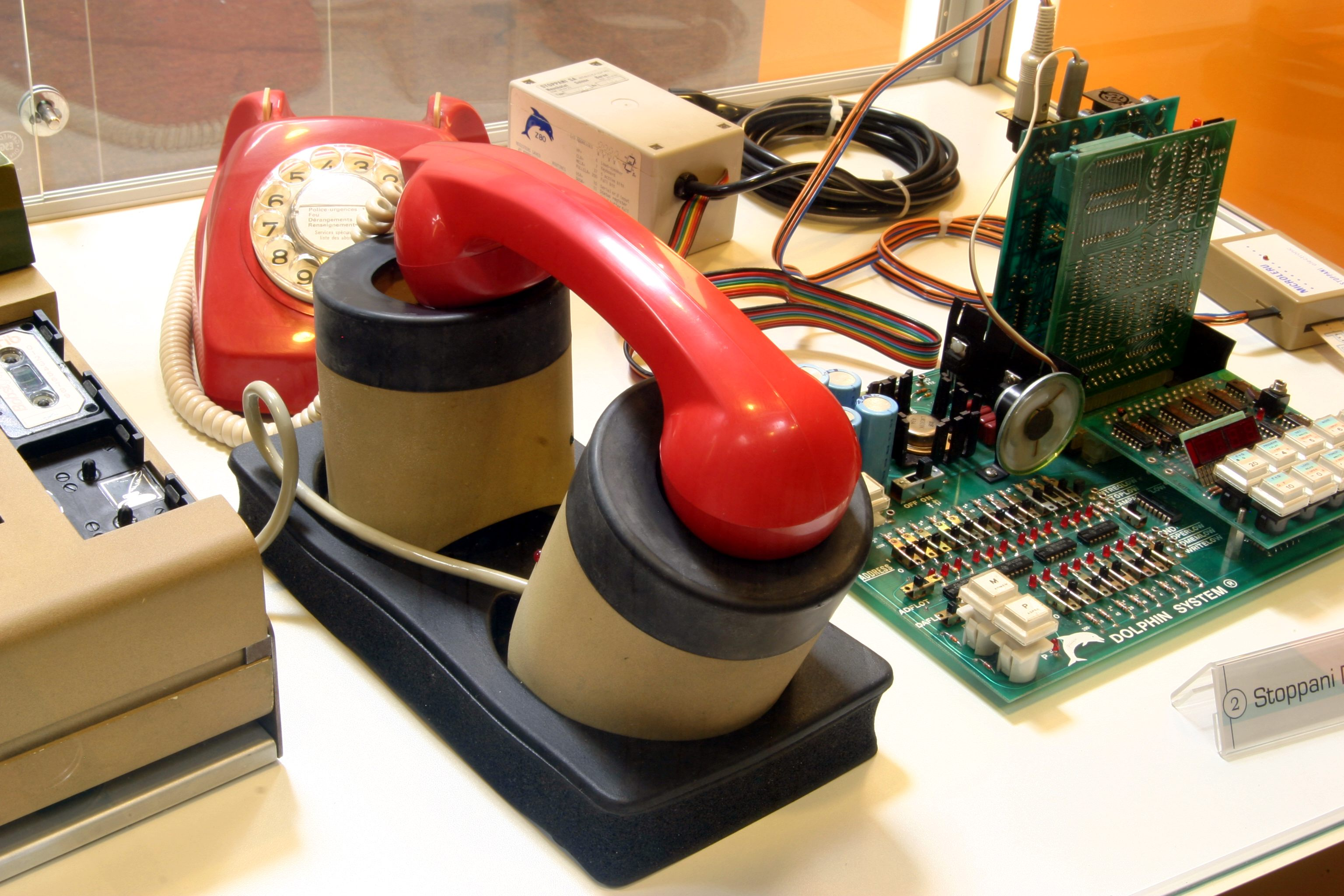
Acoustic coupler in use together with a telephone handset

Hayes and Heatherington, having met as fellow employees of National Data Corporation, formed a company to facilitate automating the process of dialing a modem. Their offering "happened to be the first modem created for a personal computer." The company is also noted as "the first to integrate its own command set" (known as the Hayes command set).

This automated hardware and software combination contrasted with the work they had performed at National Data, where they handled electronic money transfers and credit card authorizations (manually dialing, using acoustic coupler modems).

A 1981 look at the Hayes firm's internal operation described Heatherington as "technical guru .. provide technical solutions."

Heatherington retired from Hayes Microcomputer in 1985; his share of the firm resulted in receiving $20 million.

The Hayes company's products were superseded by higher speed modems, and Hayes Microcomputer Products went bankrupt in 1998.

== Education ==
Heatherington majored in electrical engineering at Southern Polytechnic State University.
