= SupraFAXModem 14400 =

Type of modem

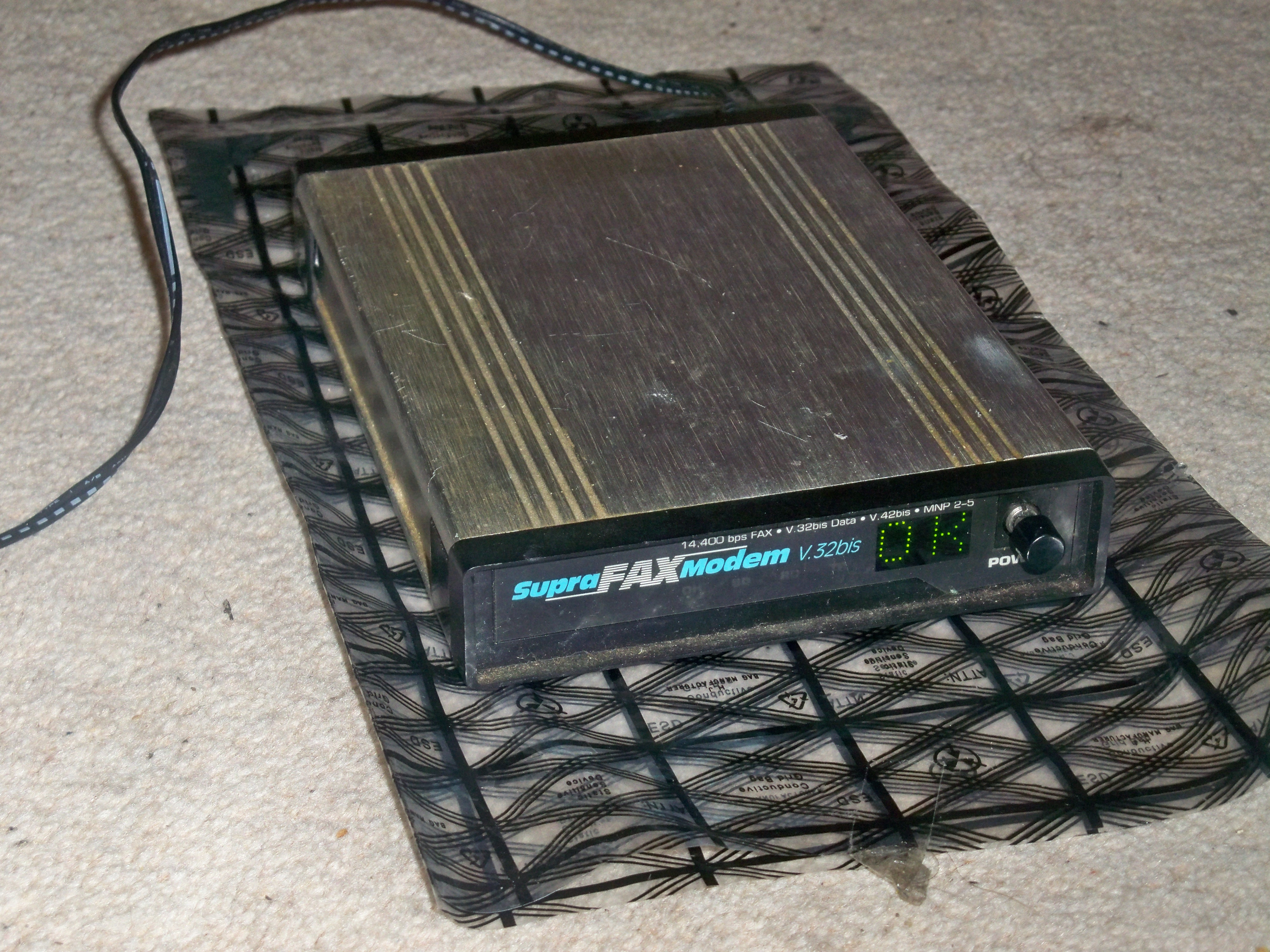
SupraFAXModem V.32bis modem. The two-digit display can be seen on the right.

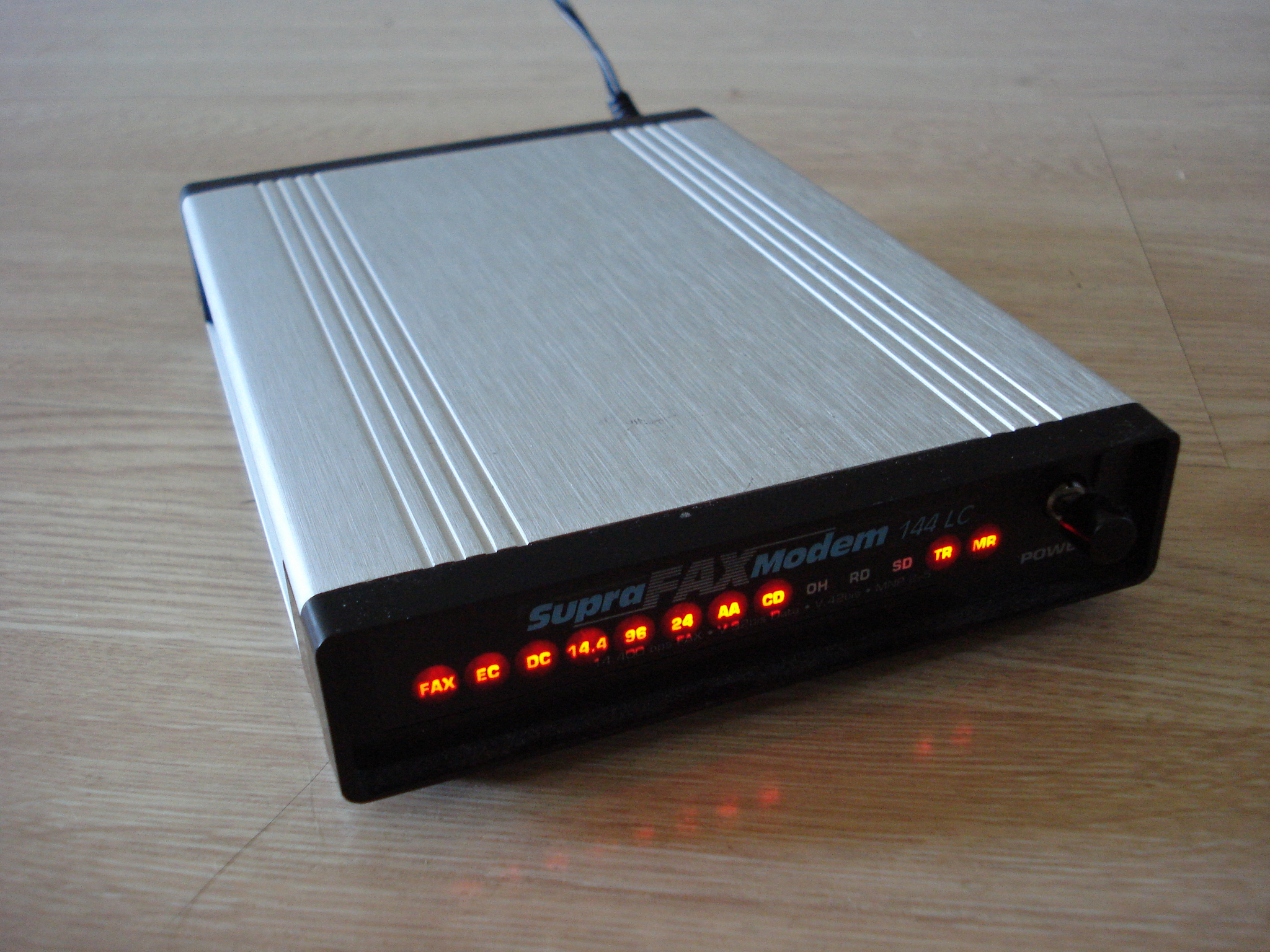
SupraFAXModem 144 LC modem (1996)

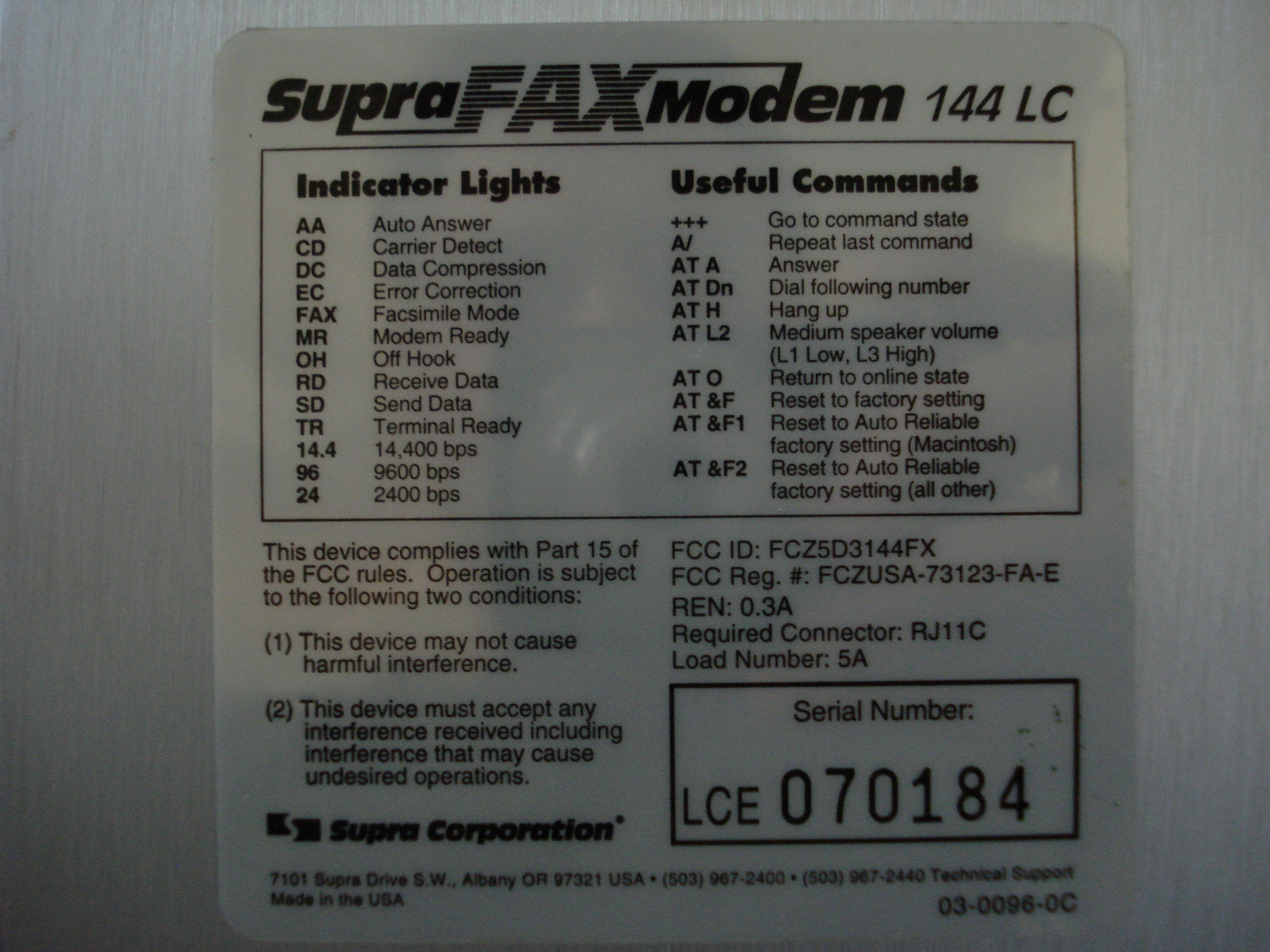
Sticker on bottom of SupraFAXModem 144 LC modem

The SupraFAXModem 14400 is a v.32bis modem. When it was launched by Supra, Inc. in January 1992 for US$399 (equivalent to $890 in 2024), (Note: Difference sources list the price between $349 and $399) the 14,400 bit/s model was less expensive than most existing 9600 bit/s models. This price/performance ratio made it a disruptive technology, and its introduction drove modem prices sharply downward. Whereas a 9600 bit/s modem was perhaps $599 before its introduction, by the end of the year, $250 14400 bit/s modems were not uncommon.

== Background ==
Supra had been a small player in the computer market through the mid-to-late 1980s, known originally for their external hard drives for the Atari ST and a variety of follow-on products. During 1991, Rockwell International's chip-making arm developed a new modem driver chipset that included all of the latest standards that were then under development. Supra, never having been known as a "player" in the modem world, designed a modem based on the new chipset, and arranged a short-term exclusivity agreement.

== Design ==
Not content with simply being the first consumer v.32bis modem on the market, Supra made a number of improvements over existing designs. One was the use of a much smaller case, about half the size of most models. The size and shape of modems had initially been set by the original Hayes Smartmodem in 1981, and its case design was widely used a decade later despite the miniaturization of technology since then. The Supra's smaller design made it much easier to fit on a desk. Additionally, Supra replaced many indicator lights with a two-digit green dot matrix LED display that showed the speed of connection and other information such as "RI" for ring indication and "CD" for carrier detect. Later models such as the LC ("Low Cost") used individual lamps that were a common feature of external modems.

== Software ==
In addition to the basic modem, Supra also introduced software to make better use of all the features of the modem. In particular, Supra re-packaged FAXstf as FAXCilitate, a Macintosh fax application that allowed any application that supported printing to send the output as a fax instead. They later introduced Supra VoiceMail, another Mac application written by STF Technologies that turned the computer into a digital answering machine with caller id routing and similar features.

== Problems ==
The SupraFAXModem was by no means a perfect product. Continued high-speed use caused the driver chipset to heat up, and as the case lacked any airflow, the modems would eventually get hot enough to lose the ability to connect and start dropping calls. Another minor issue was that the status display codes in the alphanumeric display rotated through several different indications, and important information like CD would only be displayed every few seconds. Both of these issues make them unsuitable for "host side" use on a bulletin board system or Internet service provider, but on the client end these issues were simply not important.

== Other models ==
Supra also released a v.32 version at the same time, but it seems to have been fairly uncommon if it was ever really available. Mentions of it disappear by late 1992. The 144 LC was a low-cost version that lacked the alphanumeric display and replaced it with conventional LED indicator lamps. They followed up the 14400's with the SupraFAXModem 288, the first consumer v.34 modem, and then a series of various versions with different features. The SupraExpress was a low-cost series that scaled to lower price points, housed in an all-plastic case and lacking most of the indicator lights.
