= Paul Collard =

Paul Trevor Collard
- Born: 7 July 1953; Weston-Super-Mare, U.K.
- Died: 28 December 2005 (aged 53); Chicago, IL, U.S.
- Spouse: Rebecca Janowitz (m. 1979)

Paul Trevor Collard (7 July 1952 – 28 December 2005) was an entrepreneur who founded USRobotics in 1976 with Casey Cowell and Steve Muka.

== Early life ==
Paul Collard was born in Weston-Super-Mare, England, to Roy and Margaret Collard. He went to the Weston-super-Mare Grammar School for Boys, and graduated from the University of Sussex with a degree in applied physics.

== USRobotics ==
While working at the University of Chicago's Computation Center, Collard joined up with Casey Cowell, Stephen Muka, Stan Metcalf, and Tom Rossen to form USRobotics. Paul began designing modems using the digital Design skills he learned at the University of Sussex. Paul left USRobotics in 1987.

== Midway Labs ==
After attending a lecture at the University of Chicago on solar power, Collard left to start Midway Labs a solar power company using Roland Winston's non-imaging optics to build concentrator solar electric panels.

== Personal life ==
Paul Collard married Rebecca Janowitz from Chicago. They had two children.
