= Applied Engineering =

- Applied Engineering Logo
- Industry: Personal Computers
- Defunct: 1994
- Fate: Defunct
- Products: Expansion cards for the Apple II, Mac, and Amiga.

Applied Engineering, headquartered in Carrollton, Texas, was a leading third-party hardware vendor for Apple II computers from the early 1980s until the mid-1990s.

== History ==
Applied Engineering built a reputation among Apple II owners for their Apple II add-on boards and expansion options, often developing products for the Apple II line that neither Apple Computer nor other third-party vendors offered, at the same time providing a warranty.

By the early 1990s, as Apple Computer, Inc., began to withdraw support for the Apple II series and focus on the Macintosh line, the market for Apple II hardware and software began to wane. Many Apple II users began to migrate to other platforms, such as the Macintosh and IBM PC-compatibles. In an attempt to capitalize on its well-known brand name among previous Apple II owners, Applied Engineering began to market products for the Macintosh and Commodore Amiga lines. However, because of stiff competition in already active markets, and AE's late entries, Applied Engineering could not duplicate the success it had experienced with the Apple II. Around the same time, cost-cutting measures were implemented, such as shortening warranty periods, charging for technical support (via a 1-900 number) and a using inferior parts, turning off loyal and long-time customers. Eventually dwindling Apple II sales and a failure to shift into other markets caused Applied Engineering to go out of business by 1994.

== Product offerings ==
Some of Applied Engineering's best-known products for the Apple II included:

- RamWorks — memory expansion card for the Apple IIe
- TransWarp — CPU accelerator card for the Apple IIe and Apple IIGS
- Vulcan — internal hard drive
- PC Transporter — NEC V30 (Intel 8086-compatible) card that allowed Apple IIs to run MS-DOS programs

The TransWarp family of Apple II accelerators consisted of multiple products. The original TransWarp took over from the standard 1-MHz 6502 or 65C02 used in the Apple IIe with a 3.6 MHz version of the 65C02 (which could also be run at 1.8 MHz, selectable through hardware) and turned on and off completely through software. The TransWarp was later followed by a TransWarp II and TransWarp III, the latter of which was announced but never actually went into production. With Apple Computer's release of the Apple IIGS, Applied Engineering followed with a TransWarp GS, which provided an accelerated version of the 65C816 processor on which the IIGS was based.

Multi-function cards were a mainstay of AE's product offerings, of which the Serial Pro serial interface card was a typical example. Besides offering a standard RS-232 serial port, the card included a ProDOS-compatible real-time clock, thus combining two cards into one and freeing up an extra slot. When used with a dot-matrix printer, the Serial Pro offered several screen-dump print options, such as printing either of the two Apple II high-resolution pages alone, both in a single dump, or the first hi-res page rotated or inverted.

== Partial product list ==
=== For all Apple IIs except IIc/IIc Plus ===
- Serial Pro — Apple II serial (RS-232) card
- Parallel Pro — Apple II parallel (IEEE 1284) card
- Buffer Pro — Buffer add-on for Parallel Pro
- Vulcan — Internal hard disk and disk controller
- Vulcan Gold — Internal hard disk
- PC Transporter — NEC V30 (Intel 8086-compatible) IBM PC co-processor card
- Super Music Synthesizer — Apple II sound card
- Phasor — Apple II sound card
- TimeMaster H. O. and TimeMaster II H. O. — Apple II real-time clock card
- A/D + D/A Card — Analog/digital signal acquisition and industrial control card
- I/O 32 Card — 32-bit TTL/CMOS digital I/O card
- DataLink 1200/2400 — internal telephone modems
- FastMath — Math co-processor card
- Z-80 Plus — CP/M card

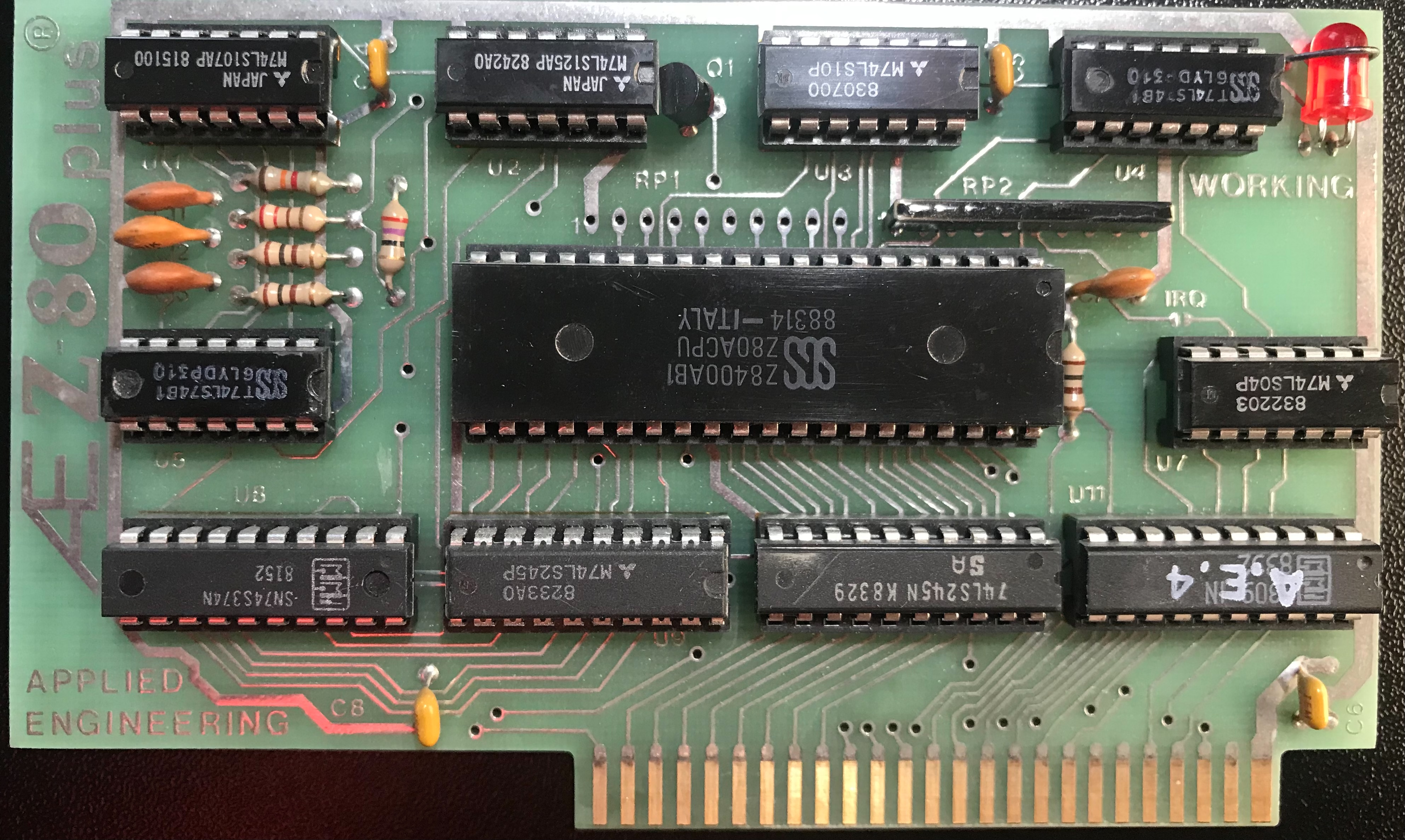
Æ Applied Engineering Z-80 Plus CPM card

=== Apple II/II Plus Specific ===
- AE 16K Card — Reduced-chip substitute for Apple's 16 KB Language Card
- ViewMaster 80 — Videx- and Videoterm-compatible 80-column card with lowercase and light pen support

=== Apple IIe ===
- MemoryMaster — Early reduced-chip substitute for Apple's Extended 80-Column Card (80 columns + 64 KB RAM)
- MemoryMaster IIe — replacement 80-column card with 64 KB—256 KB
- RamWorks (a. k. a. RamWorks I, RamWorks Basic) — 80-column + memory expansion card with 256—1024 KB RAM
- RamWorks II — 80-column + memory expansion card with 1+ MB RAM
- RamWorks III — 80-column + memory expansion card with 1-3 MB RAM
- RamKeeper — Battery backup option for RamWorks series (to use RAM as non-volatile RAM disk)
- RamFactor — Slot 1 to 7 memory card for //e and II+. Up to 1 MB RAM
- RamFactor 4 Meg Expander — Increase RamFactor memory by up to 4 MB for a maximum of 5 MB on one slot
- RamCharger — Battery backup option for the RamFactor which could allow booting from a RAM drive
- ColorLink — Daughterboard RGB option for RamWorks series providing analog and IBM-compatible RGB output
- Digital Prism — Daughterboard RGB option for RamWorks series providing IBM-compatible RGB output only
- TransWarp, TransWarp II — Apple II accelerator card

=== Apple IIc/IIc Plus ===
- Z-RAM, Z-RAM Ultra, Z-RAM Ultra II, Z-RAM Ultra III — Memory expansion card
- RAM Express, RAM Express II — Memory expansion card (the RAM Express is an Apple-branded IIc RAM card with Applied Engineering stickers applied to cover the Apple logo)
- Z-80c — CP/M card

=== Apple IIGS ===
- TransWarp GS — Apple IIGS accelerator card
- GS-RAM, GS-RAM Ultra, GS-RAM Plus — Apple IIGS memory expansion cards. The cards hold 1.5 MB, 4 MB, and 6 MB respectively.
- RamKeeper — Battery backed RAM drive for the Apple IIGS
- Sonic Blaster — Apple IIGS sound card
- Audio Animator — Apple IIGS sound card with external audio mixer and MIDI I/O
- Conserver — Integrated disk drive organizer, surge protector, and cooling fan

=== Miscellaneous ===
- AE 1.6-MB Drive — 1.6 MB, 3.5-inch floppy drive for IIGS (Apple's 3.5-inch drives for the Apple II stopped at 800 KB; GS/OS driver needed for 1.6-MB utilization)
- AE 1.44-MB Drive — 1.44 MB, 3.5-inch floppy drive for Commodore Amiga 500, 2000 beat Commodore's own high-density drive to market. Not compatible with the 1.76 MB Amiga Chinon high-density floppy.
- AE 800-KB Drive — 800 KB, 3.5-inch floppy drive for IIe, IIc/IIc Plus, and IIGS
- TransWarp — 16 and 40 MHz accelerator boards for Macintosh SE

== See also ==
- Apple II peripheral cards
