= Supra Corporation =

- Formerly: Microbits Peripheral Products (until 1986)
- Industry: Electronics
- Founders: John Wiley; Alan Ackerman
- Defunct: 1995
- Fate: Acquired by Diamond Multimedia

Supra Corporation was best known as a manufacturer of modems for personal computers, but also produced a range of hardware for the Amiga and Atari ST, including hard drives, SCSI controllers, memory boards, and processor accelerators.

They were purchased by Diamond Multimedia in 1995.

== Early history ==
The company was founded by John Wiley and Alan Ackerman in 1981 when they were fresh out of high school as Microbits Peripheral Products (MPP), a provider of interface products for Atari 8-bit computers. The two of them were friends in high school when they developed various computer hardware for the school computers, and were best known for a 300 baud modem and a printer interface. The company was successful for some time, but a number of factors led to its bankruptcy around 1986, and its reformation as Supra, initially selling hard drives for the Atari ST. Originally from Albany, Oregon, they later moved to Vancouver, Washington.

== SupraFAXModem 14400 ==
In 1991 the company arranged a deal with Rockwell International to use their new V.32bis 14,400 bit/s modem chips with an exclusivity arrangement. Their SupraFAXModem 14400 was sold at prices about half that of the slower 9600 V.32 models of the same era, and its introduction led to a rapid downward spiral in modem pricing.

== Notable Dates ==
- 1986 - Supra introduces a 10 MB hard drive for the Atari ST.
- 1987 - Supra introduces the Supra Modem 2400 at $179.
- 1991 - Supra introduces the SupraFAXModem 14400 at $399 and the SupraFAXModem V.32 at $299.
- 1994 - Supra purchases PSI Integration
- 1994 - Supra ships First 28.8 Modem
- 1994 - Supra ships First Voice Modem
- 1995 - Supra purchased by Diamond Multimedia
- 1999 - S3 Graphics purchases Diamond Multimedia

== Products ==
- Supra Modems
- Supra Voice Modems

== Software ==
- FAXCilitate
- Supra VoiceMail
