= Practical Peripherals =

Defunct American modem manufacturer

Practical Peripherals, Inc.
- Type: Private (1981–1989); Subsidiary (1989–1994); Division (1994–1999)
- Industry: Computer
- Founded: 1981; 45 years ago in Westlake Village, California, United States
- Founder: Michael Seedman
- Defunct: 1994; 32 years ago
- Fate: Acquired by Hayes Microcomputer Products in 1989; formally merged with Hayes in 1994; operations discontinued in 1997; brand discontinued in 1999
- Products: Modems
- Number of employees: 700 (1992, peak)

Practical Peripherals, Inc., was a private American computer peripheral manufacturer active from 1981 to 1999 and based in Los Angeles County. Founded by Michael Seedman, the company specialized in telecommunications products, primarily modems, for personal computers. Seedman led the company from its inception in 1981 until 1993, after Practical Peripherals was sold to Hayes Microcomputer Products.

The company ventured into the market with print buffers under the Microbuffer brand, offering various forms tailored for different systems and needs. Around 1985, the company expanded its product line by introducing modems, under the brand name Practical Modem (PM). In 1989, Practical was acquired by Hayes, who kept the company around as a subsidiary until 1999, when Hayes themselves were bought out by Zoom Telephonics.

== History ==
=== Pre-acquisition (1981–1989) ===
Practical Peripherals, Inc., was incorporated in 1981 by Michael S. Seedman in Westlake Village, California, as a manufacturer of computer peripherals. Its first products in 1982 were a series of print buffer (spooler) expansion cards, sold under the Microbuffer name. This encompassed the Microbuffer II for the Apple II, the Microbuffer E for the Epson MX-80 printer, standalone Microbuffers with two serial or parallel ports, and a versatile universal Microbuffer supporting both serial and parallel use. These products featured internal dynamic memory capacities ranging from 16 KB to 512 KB.

The company began diversifying its operations in 1985, branching into telecommunications products for personal computers. It introduced modems for personal computers under the Practical Modem brand name, as well as data buffer devices for faxes. The company's modem line was its hottest seller. It commenced with the Practical Modem 1200 (PM1200) in December 1985, providing speeds of 1200 bps for both internal and external modems. Progressing through their product offerings, Practical Peripherals culminated with the PM56K, a high-speed internal and external modem operating at 56,000 bps, in 1997.

By the mid-1980s, other members of the Seedman family began presiding over operations at Practical. Michael's brother Eric was hired as vice president of sales and his father Joseph acted as chief operating officer under CEO Michael.

=== Post-acquisition (1989–1999) ===
In 1985, Practical was sued for alleged patent infringement by Hayes Microcomputer Products of Atlanta, Georgia, of the latter's Heatherington '302 patent. Practical counter-sued in 1988, claiming that Hayes' patent was invalid. Rather than drag on legal proceedings, Hayes acquired Practical for an undisclosed sum in August 1989, allowing it to operate as an independently operating subsidiary, the Practical brand surviving, and short-circuiting their respective lawsuits. Practical that year achieved sales of nearly $50 million on their modem products from 1990 to 1992.

In May 1992, Hayes doubled the size of Practical's headquarters moving it from Westlake Village to a 70,000-square-foot facility in Thousand Oaks, California. All operations of the company were performed under one roof at this new location, including marketing, development, administration, and manufacturing. The company increased their payroll in tandem, the company peaking at 700 workers in September 1992. Sales of Practical's products peaked that year as well, at just over $50 million.

In 1993, founder Michael Seedman departed from Practical Peripherals to join rival modem maker U.S. Robotics of Schaumburg, Illinois, as their senior VP and general manager. Following price cuts and consolidation of the company's operations in 1993, employment at Practical gradually shrank to 575 workers by October 1994 (450 full-time workers and 125 temporary workers). Between October 1994 and November 1994, Hayes formally merged Practical into themselves, absorbing their liabilities while allowing Practical to continue to be managed independently. In late November 1994, Hayes sought Chapter 11 bankruptcy protection due to constricting cash flows, and despite reassurances that Practical would not see further consolidation, Hayes laid off 200 within Practical in late December that year. As Practical had formally merged with Hayes right before the parent company's bankruptcy, Practical's management were dragged into Chapter 11 proceedings along with them. In 1995, Hayes laid of 100 employees of Practical. In September 1996, Hayes announced that Practical's 375 remaining employees were to be laid off in the next seven months, effectively ending Practical's independent operations. Practical continued as a brand of Hayes modems for the next two years, until Hayes themselves were bought out by Zoom Telephonics in April 1999.
