= Apricorn, Inc. =

- Company type: Privately held company
- Industry: Computer hardware
- Founded: 1983; 42 years ago
- Founders: Mike Gordon and Paul Brown
- Headquarters: Poway, California, United States
- Area served: Worldwide
- Products: Secure data storage devices and accessories
- Number of employees: 39 (2024)
- Website: apricorn.com

Apricorn is an American designer and manufacturer of computer storage products, utilities and accessories. It was established in 1983 as a private company by Mike Gordon and Paul Brown. The company headquarters is located in Poway, California, United States. It also has branches in Canada.

== History ==
The company was founded in 1983. They developed hardware-based, encrypted external storage products that used their own onboard keypad and internal hardware.

In 2007, Apricorn's EZ Bus Desktop SATA 500GB drive earned PC World's Best Buy distinction and top performance rating.

Since then they specialized in a variety of encrypted storage devices.

== Notable products ==
Company's EZ Gig II Backup and Disaster Recovery Software may be used for all company's storage products. It was developed to address the rapidly expanding usage of laptops and the corresponding growth of the concern for mobile data safety.

The company's AEGIS line of external storage are plug-and-play, with necessary drivers residing within and loading upon plugin automatically. They also offer an encryption option.

They have many products and even software for computers and laptops. They are best known for their external and internal products. For example, Apricorn Inc manufactures external hard drives and USB flash drives that require a real-time 256-bit AES-XTS Hardware Encryption and a secured pin.
