= Prometheus Products =

American computer peripheral manufacturer

Prometheus Products, Inc.
- Type: Private
- Industry: Computer
- Founded: January 1981; 45 years ago
- Founder: Robert D. Christiansen
- Defunct: January 1996; 30 years ago
- Fate: Acquired by Sierra Semiconductor in October 1994; divested and dissolved in 1996
- Products: Modems; Sound cards

Prometheus Products, Inc. was an American computer peripheral manufacturer active from 1981 to 1996. The company primarily manufactured modems and sound cards for personal computers for the bulk of its existence.

== History ==
Prometheus Products was incorporated in Fremont, California, in January 1981. It was principally founded by Robert D. Christiansen, who was named both president and head of marketing. The company was founded to capitalize on Apple II home computers by providing peripherals and other add-on products. In 1984, the company began focusing on the production of modems, following a breakthrough in modem design developed within Prometheus that allowed the relatively inexpensive Intel 8031 to be used as a digital signal processor. This replaced the need for numerous analog devices for signal processing circuits customary in modem design at the time.

In 1984, the company's board of directors hired Tom McShane as chairman of the company; he shortly after expanded the company to occupy two buildings, including a production factory and a research and development company, within Fremont. Prometheus was en route to generating $7 million in sales in 1987 and was one of the top 10 modem manufacturers ranked by global sales. Between 1987 and 1989, the company relocated out of state to Tigard, Oregon.

In November 1987, the company was sued by Hayes Microcomputer Products over alleged infringement of the Heatherington '302 patent, which defined the Time Independent Escape Sequence modem protocol used Hayes's Smartmodems and which was adapted by Prometheus's modems. The protracted lawsuit was settled out of court in January 1991, with Prometheus agreeing to license the technology from Hayes and pay licensing back-fees.

In 1992, the company merged with Technology Concepts, Inc., a manufacturer of computer peripherals, mainly fax and enhanced voice modems but also computer keyboards, based in Belmont, California. Prometheus relocated again to Tualatin, Oregon, by early 1994.

In early 1994, the company introduced its first series of sound cards, the Aria 16 (comprising the flagship Aria 16 product and the Aria 16se featuring a SCSI-2 connector for connecting to optical drives). The Aria 16 was based on Sierra Semiconductor's Aria sound chipset featuring 32-polyphony wavetable synthesis and Sound Blaster–compatible FM synthesis. The Aria 16 was bargain priced but received decent reviews from the computer press of its day. Prometheus' sound cards soon found use in prebuilt computer systems manufactured by IBM and DEC. Creative Technology, the creators of Sound Blaster, sued Prometheus in 1994, alleging that Prometheus had falsely advertised the Aria 16 by claiming that it was "100% Sound Blaster compatible" on the retail box despite not reaching that standard of compatibility. In April that year, the two settled out of court, with Prometheus reprinting the boxes to instead claim "Sound Blaster emulation".

Sales of Prometheus' modems cooled considerably in the early 1990s, the company trailing behind the growing pace of advancements in modem bit rates and hampered by quality control issues stemming for slow communication with their Taiwanese manufacturing contract. In October 1994, Sierra Semiconductor purchased Prometheus Products in whole for an undisclosed sum of cash, making the company a subsidiary under Sierra while still operating out of Tualatin. By the end of 1994, Christiansen stepped down as president. He was replaced by Jack Murphy, who had recently left rival modem manufacturer Practical Peripherals earlier in the year. He assumed Christiansen's post in the first week of 1995. Sierra tasked him with turning the company around; actions Murphy took included moving the company's manufacturing efforts stateside and shuffling the company's management to included his contacts from Practical Peripherals, Apple, and Tektronix.

These actions were not enough to stem Prometheus' losses immediately, the subsidiary generating $4.6 million in losses on revenues of $19 million by late 1995. In January 1996, Sierra announced the divestiture and sale of Prometheus to the highest bidder.
