= Zoom Telephonics =

American networking company

Minim, Inc.
- Formerly: Zoom Telephonics, Inc. (1977–2020)
- Type: Public
- Traded as: Nasdaq: MINM
- Founded: 1977; 49 years ago
- Founder: Frank B. Manning; Bruce Kramer
- Defunct: March 2024; 2 years ago
- Fate: Acquired by e2Companies, Inc.
- Headquarters: Manchester, New Hampshire, U.S.
- Area served: Global
- Website: www.minim.com

Zoom Telephonics, Inc. was an American networking company that began as a manufacturer of modems and other computer networking and telephony hardware. The company was founded by two MIT graduates in 1977. Following a 2020 merger with Minim, Inc., Zoom adopted this name and moved its headquarters from Boston, Massachusetts, to Manchester, New Hampshire. As Minim, the company sold cable modems, gateways, WiFi routers, mesh WiFi systems, and other home networking products, with an emphasis on home automation. In 2024, following financial turmoil, Minim was acquired by e2Companies, an energy management company based in Florida.

== History ==
Zoom Telephonics was founded in 1977 as a home networking product manufacturer, headquartered in Boston, Massachusetts. The company was founded by Frank B. Manning and Bruce Kramer, two fellow roommates and graduates of the Massachusetts Institute of Technology (MIT) who had known each other since the late 1960s. The company's first product was a modification kit for telephones that turned off the phone's ringer with the flick of a switch. Branded the "Silencer", it generated $200,000 in the first few years of Zoom's existence and prompted the founders to release more telephonic gadgets.

In 1980, the company released an automatic dialer called the "Demon Dialer". Developed for customers of independent phone companies wanting to make long-distance calls, which required dialing call prefix and feature group digits, the product helped Zoom grow to $6 million in annual sales. The practice of demon dialing lends its namesake to this product. The "Demon Dialer" proved short-lived in usefulness after the breakup of the Bell System, which allowed these independent companies to harness so-called 1+10 dialing.

Zoom turned to developing dial-up modems for microcomputers such as the Apple II and the IBM PC. Their first modem, introduced in 1983 and called the Networker, was so popular that the company had difficulty finding enough shelf space in retail outlets, so Zoom's executives turned to mail order as an alternative sales channel. By 1987, the company had enough brand recognition to convince personal computer manufacturers, enterprise distributors, and high-volume retailers to stock Zoom's modems, and the company abandoned direct mail. In 1990, Zoom went public on the Nasdaq.

With the spread of the Internet in the mid-1990s, Zoom became a market leader in the modem business. Although the company contracted the manufacture of some of its cheaper products offshore at this time, some were still manufactured in its factory in Boston. The introduction of low-cost, high-speed modems during this period led to most of the established players being pushed out of the market by the smaller firms, and Zoom purchased the once much larger Hayes Microcomputer Products in July 1999, using the name on some high-end modems.

Zoom's dominance waned with the advent of affordable broadband Internet in the early 2000s. Despite contracting factories in Mexico to manufacture Zoom-branded cable modems, most broadband customers were complacent with the modems provided by their ISPs. Between then and 2015, Zoom stagnated. In 2015, the company reached a five-year licensing agreement with Motorola Mobility beginning 2016, to use the Motorola brand on its home network and cable products. Motorola had divested its existing Motorola Home business to Arris Group in 2013 (following the sale of Motorola Mobility to Google), but this primarily included a transitional license to the Motorola trademark in these segments. Following this, sales rose 66 percent to roughly $17.8 million. Between 2017 and 2018, sales rose again, to $32 million.

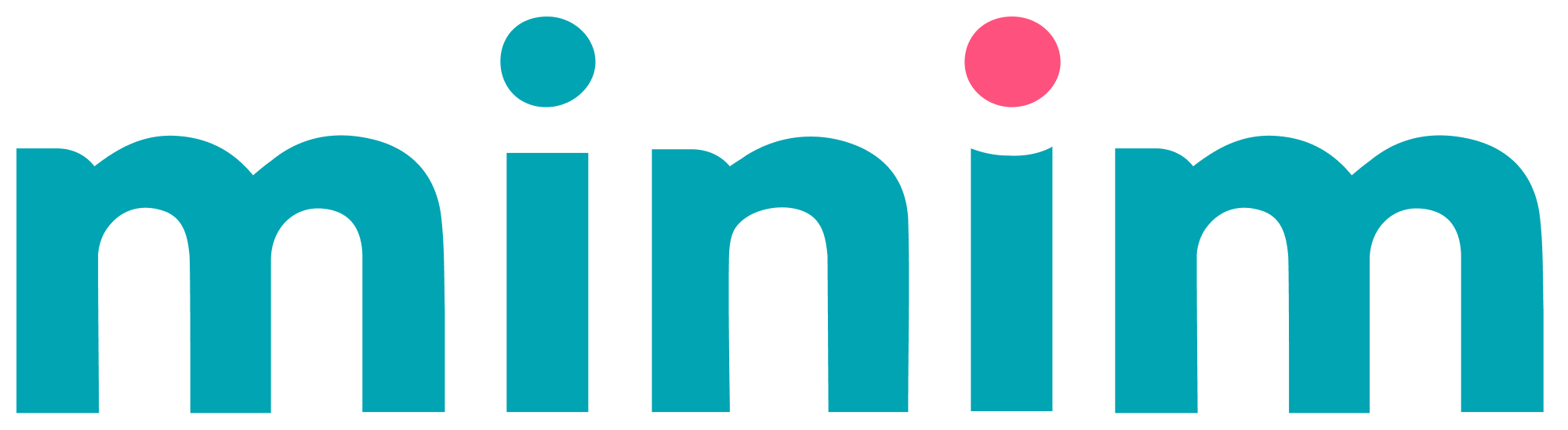
Logo of Minim, Inc. from 2020 to 2024

In December 2020, the company completed a merger with Minim, Inc. and rebranded to Minim, moved their headquarters from Boston, Massachusetts, to Manchester, New Hampshire, and began selling cable modems, gateways, WiFi routers, mesh WiFi systems, and other home networking products, with an emphasis on home automation.

On September 11, 2023, Minim announced it was exploring options in effort to save the company from permanent closure, including a potential Chapter 11 bankruptcy filing. Effective immediately after the announcement, Minim slashed approximately 78% of its workforce. In March 2024, Minim was acquired by e2Companies, an energy management company based in Florida.
