= Hayes Microcomputer Products =

U.S.-based manufacturer of modems

- Company type: Public
- Industry: Modems
- Founded: 1977; 49 years ago
- Founder: Dale Heatherington
- Defunct: 1999
- Fate: Liquidation; name acquired by Zoom Telephonics
- Headquarters: Norcross, Georgia, U.S.
- Website: hayes.com at the Wayback Machine (archived 1998-02-02)

Hayes Microcomputer Products was a US-based manufacturer of modems. The company is known for the Smartmodem, which introduced a control language for operating the functions of the modem via the serial interface, in contrast to manual operation with front-panel switches. This smart modem approach dramatically simplified and automated operation. Today almost all modems use a variant of the Hayes AT command set.

Hayes was a major brand in the modem market from the introduction of the original 300 bit/s Smartmodem in 1981. They remained a major vendor throughout the 1980s, periodically introducing models with higher throughput. Their competition through this period was primarily from two other high-end vendors, USRobotics and Telebit, while other companies mostly sold into niches or were strictly low-end offerings.

In the early 1990s a number of greatly cost-reduced high-performance modems were released by competitors, notably the SupraFAXModem 14400 in 1992, which eroded price points in the market. Hayes was never able to respond effectively. The widespread introduction of ADSL and cable modems in the mid-1990s repeatedly drove the company in Chapter 11 protection before being liquidated in 1999.

== Before Hayes ==
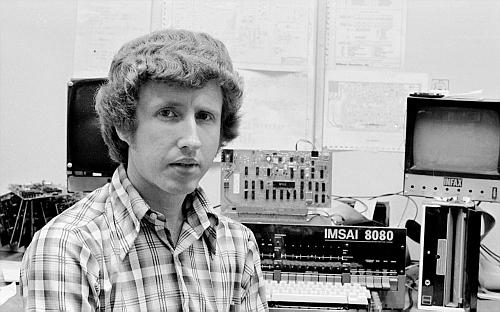
Dale Heatherington with the prototype 80-103A

Dennis C. Hayes left the Georgia Institute of Technology in the mid-1970s to work at an early data communications company, National Data Corporation, a company that, among its many businesses, handled electronic money transfers and credit card authorizations. Hayes' job was to set up modem connections for NDC's customers.

Hayes also worked for a time at Financial Data Sciences, which sold automated teller machines to the savings and loan (S&L) market, modifying machines sold by larger companies to large banks with the branding of the smaller S&L. From this company, he learned the value of selling into niche markets the larger players ignored.

Hayes was a computer hobbyist, and felt that modems would be highly compelling to users of the new 8-bit computers that would soon be known as home computers. However, existing modems were simply too expensive and difficult to use or be practical for most users. He felt that this market was likely to be ignored by the larger modem vendors like IBM.

== Early Hayes products ==
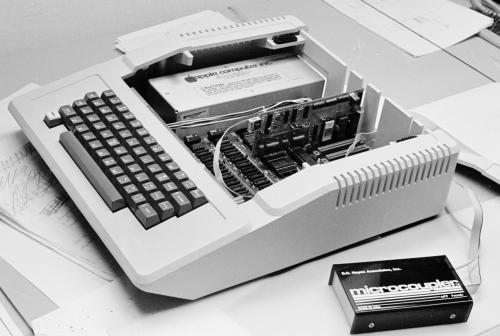
Micromodem II installed in an Apple II. The external "microcoupler" with the phone jacks and analog hardware were connected via the ribbon cable.

At the time, modems generally came in two versions, external modems using an acoustic coupler for connection, and direct-connection modems used with minicomputers or mainframes. Acoustic couplers were entirely manual; the user picked up the phone's handset, dialed manually, and then pressed the handset into the coupler if a carrier frequency was heard. Disconnecting at the end of the session was also manual, with the user lifting the handset out of the coupler and hanging it up on the phone body in order to depress the hook switch and return the phone to the on-hook state and end the call. This was a straightforward and thus a popular solution; the Novation CAT was a popular modem of this type.

Internal modems had the advantage that they could use the computer bus not only to exchange data between the computer and the modem, but command and status information as well. This allowed them to control the entire connection cycle, dialing the phone to start, and hanging up at the end. Such systems were available for large machines, especially the mainframes used by banks which had to automatically dial their branches for end-of-day updates. None of these systems were available for microcomputers, and Hayes' initial concept was to offer similar products into this market.

Hayes started producing such a system in his kitchen in April 1977 with his friend and co-worker, Dale Heatherington. Their first product was the 80-103A, a 300 bit/s Bell 103-compatible design for S-100 bus machines. At this time, it was illegal to connect any non-Bell hardware to the telephone network, so the 80-103A was designed to connect to a Bell-supplied Data Access Arrangement (DAA) which the user rented for a monthly fee. To fill in dead-times in the modem sales, they also took on part work doing electronics assembly for other companies.

Business picked up quickly, and by January 1978 they had quit their jobs at National Data to form their own company, D.C. Hayes Associates. In its first year, the new company sold $125,000 worth of product (equivalent to $617,028 in 2025).

Sales further improved in early 1979 with the introduction of the 300 bit/s Micromodem 100 for S-100 bus computers and the Micromodem II for the Apple II.

As a result of Bell having lost several key lawsuits related to the connection of unlicensed equipment to its telephone network, by 1978 it finally became legal to connect any FCC-approved system to the Bell network. To comply, Micromodems were supplied their own DAA-like connector in the form of the FCC-approved "microcoupler": a small external box that connected to the internal modem card using a ribbon cable.

In 1980, the company changed its name to Hayes Microcomputer Products.

== The Smartmodem ==
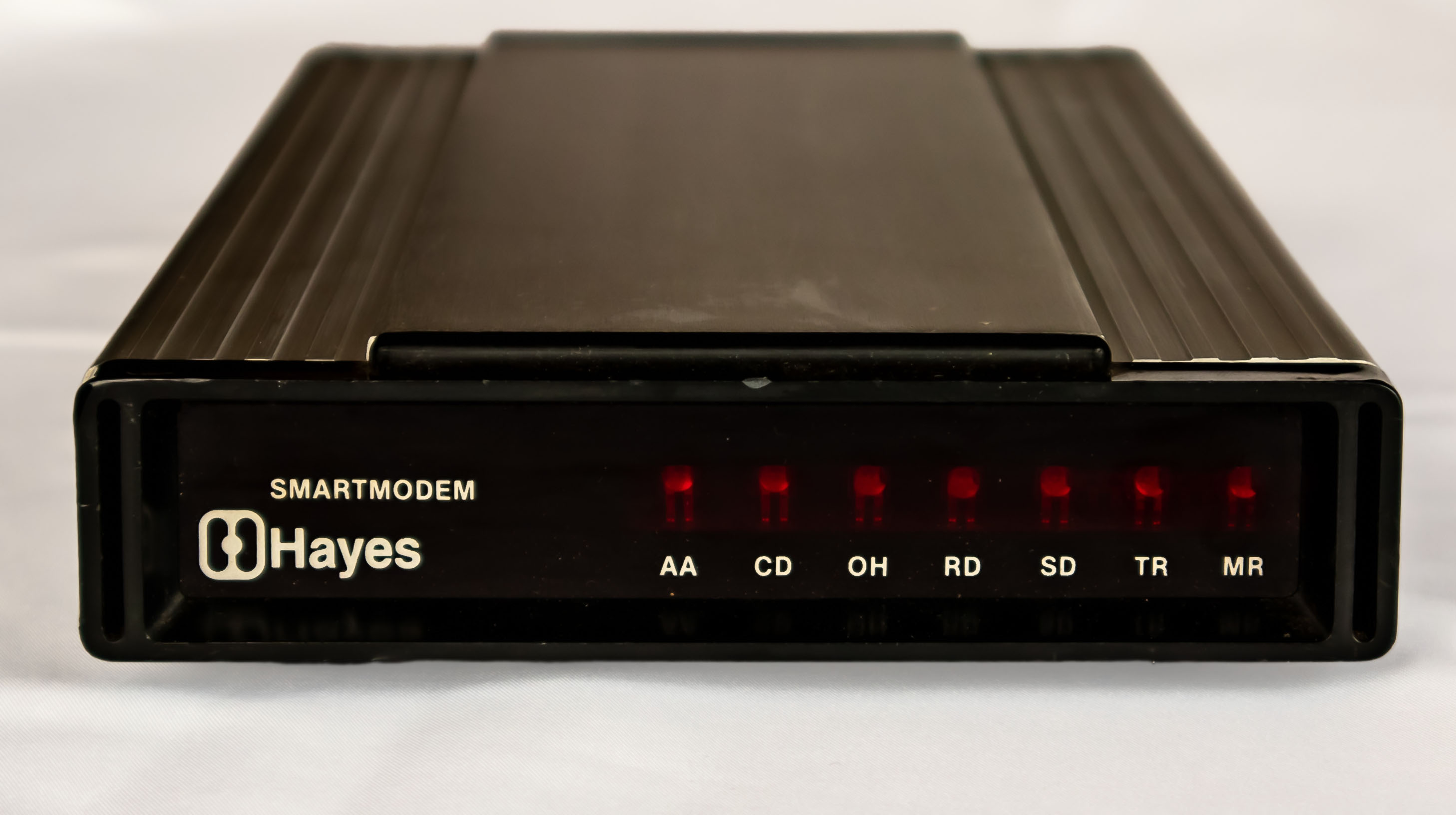
The original model 300 baud Smartmodem (1981)

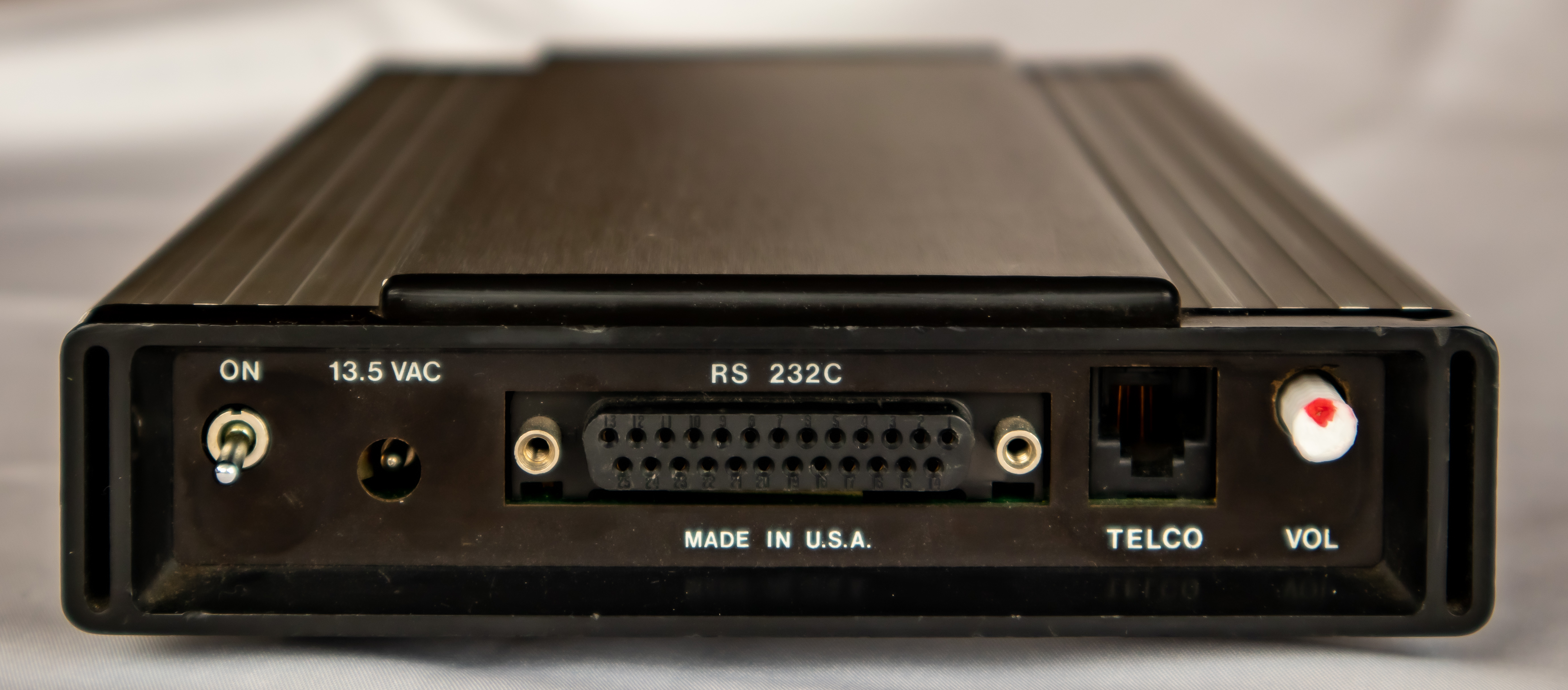
Essential interoperability provided via DB-25, RJ-11 and power jacks. Later modems dropped the manual volume control and introduced a second RJ-11 for pass-through of the telephone line.

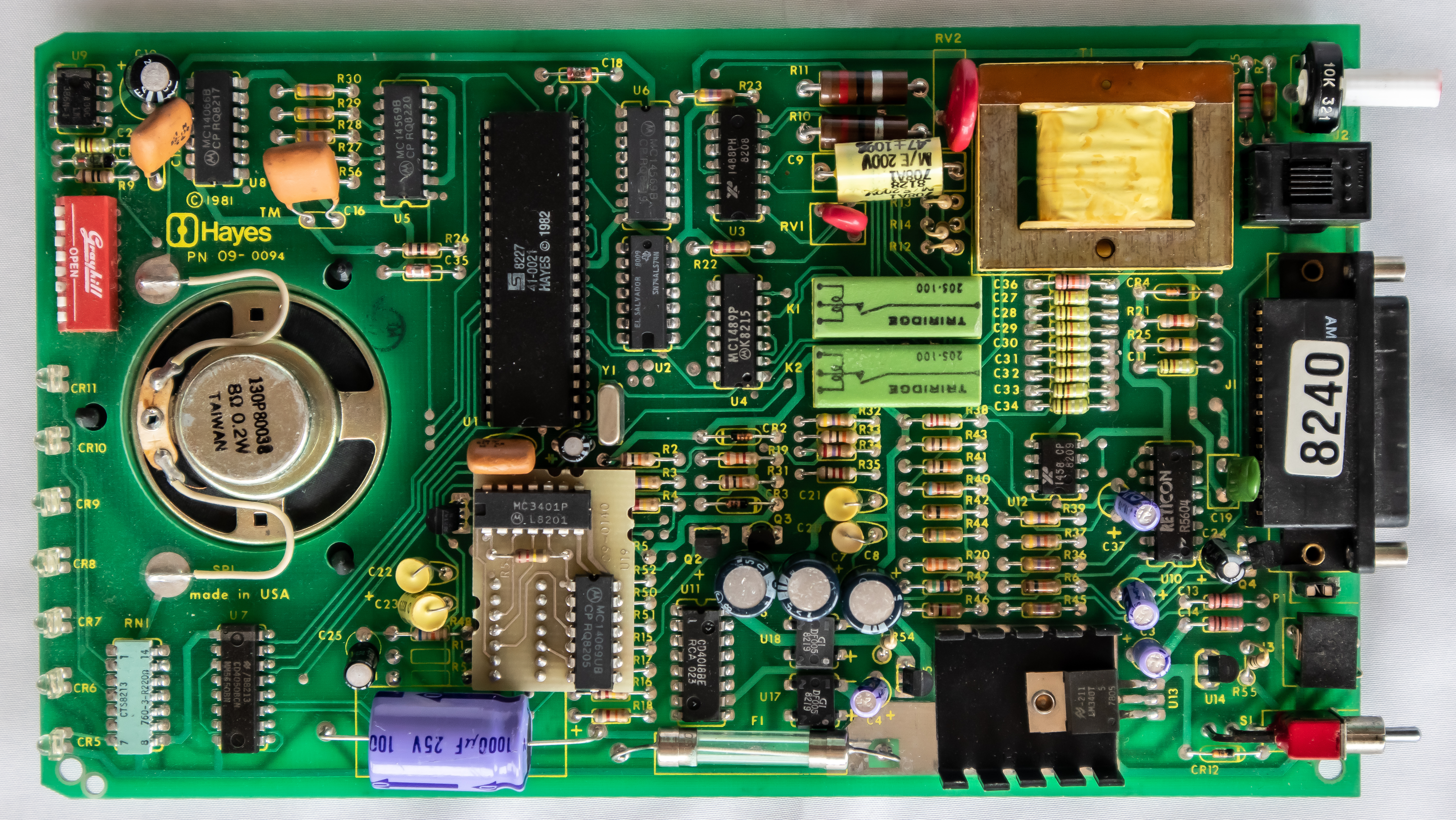
The Stack concept of an extruded aluminum tube open at each end, allowed for easy access of the front side DIP-switch (here left) for configuration. The complete circuit board was slid in from either end and thus easily accessible. This was also a common design copied by most modem manufacturers to come.

Although powerful, the internal modem was commercially impractical. Not only did it require special driver software that often meant it could only be used with a single terminal emulator, but a different hardware design was needed for every computer bus, including Apple II, S-100, TRS-80, and others. As modems became popular, users on these platforms began asking for designs as well.

A solution to the cross-platform connection was to use the RS-232 serial port instead of the internal data bus; modems were serial devices in the end, and most computers included an RS-232 port or some variant. The trick would be how to send commands over the same connection as the data. A few external modems already offered the ability to dial the phone by entering a phone number when the modem was first started, based on the idea that it could not be connected to a remote system when first powered up, so anything sent from the computer could (optionally) be interpreted as a command. The problem was sending a command to hang up, while the modem was already connected. There needed to be some way to indicate that the characters flowing out from the computer to the modem were not simply additional data to be sent to the far end, but commands to be acted on.

Hayes and the company's marketing manager Glenn Sirkis approached Heatherington with an outline for a new command-driven external modem. Several solutions to the command problem were studied, and in the end, Heatherington decided the only practical one was to have the modem operate in two modes. In one, data mode, all data forwarded from the computer was modulated and sent over the connected telephone line as it was with any other modem. In the other, command mode, data forwarded from the computer would be interpreted as commands. In this way, the modem could be instructed by the computer to perform various operations, such as hang up the phone or dial a number. The modem would normally start up in command mode.

The problem was how to move from mode to mode. One option would be to signal this using one of the many pins in the RS-232 cable. However, while the 25-pin connector on the modem side had more than enough pins for this purpose (even some meant for this purpose), the computer side often had far fewer pins connected and controllable, if it even used a full 25-pin connector at all. In fact, there were very few pins that were guaranteed to work on all computers, mostly the data in and out, "ready" indications that said whether the modem or computer was operational, and sometimes flow-control pins. While it would have been possible to use some of these pins for the sort of command-switching they needed, this may not have been universally supported across all machines.

Heatherington instead came up with the idea of using a rarely seen sequence of characters for this duty. Since these characters could be sent to the modem using the same two data pins that the port would need anyway, they could be sure that such a system would work on every computer. The sequence he decided on was +++ (three plus signs). When this was received from the computer, the modem would switch from data to command mode. Of course, it was possible that the computer would send this sequence for other reasons, for example, the sequence is contained within the text on this page, and likely would be in any document referring to modems. In order to filter out these "accidental" sequences, Heatherington's design only switched to command mode if the sequence was led and followed by a one-second pause, the guard time, in which no other data was sent. In this case it could be safely assumed that the sequence was being sent deliberately by a user, as opposed to being buried in the middle of a data stream.

With the basic idea outlined, Hayes and Sirkis gave Heatherington the go-ahead to build a prototype by adding a microcontroller to an otherwise lightly modified version of their existing 300 bit/s hardware. Sirkis was particularly interested in using the 1 MHz PIC microcontrollers, which were available for only US$1 a piece. After six months of trying to get the modem working with the PIC, Heatherington gave up and demanded they use the 8 MHz Zilog Z8 instead, a US$10 part. Sirkis acquiesced, and a working prototype was soon complete.

Hayes added a requirement of his own, that the modem be able to automatically detect what speed the computer's serial port was set to when first powered on. This was not simple unless the modem "knew" what data were initially being sent, allowing it to time the bits and thereby guess the speed. Heatherington eventually suggested the use of a well-known character sequence for this purpose, recommending AT for "attention", which is prefixed on all commands.

The new design, housed in an extruded aluminum case sized to allow a standard desktop telephone to rest on top, was announced in April 1981. It was known simply as the Smartmodem. The Smartmodem was the first modem integrating complete control over the phone line, and that allowed it to be used in exactly the same fashion with any computer.

Hayes originally had big plans for the form factor, referring to it as the Hayes Stack and intending to release a range of products that could be stacked beside the computer. In the end, only two non-modem devices were added to the line. The Hayes Stack Chronograph, an external real-time clock and the Transet 1000, a printer buffer and primitive email box. Both of these items' sales were apparently dismal. Early advertising referred to the Smartmodem as the "Hayes Stack Smartmodem", but this naming convention was dropped a short time later.

At the time of its introduction, the modem market was fairly small, and competitors generally ignored the Smartmodem. But it was not long before hobbyists were able to combine the Smartmodem with new software to create the first real bulletin board systems (BBSes), which created significant market demand. The market grew rapidly in the mid-1980s, and as the Smartmodem was the only truly "universal" modem on the market, Hayes grew to take over much of the market. By 1982, the company was selling 140,000 modems a year, with sales of $12 million annually (equivalent to $40,034,483 in 2025).

Heatherington retired from what was then a large company in 1984.

== Competition ==
The modem market in the 1970s was very simple and stagnant. Modems tended to sell at US$1 per baud. Hayes saw no need to be different—the original Hayes 300 baud modem sold for US$299 retail. At that price, Hayes could build a "Cadillac of modems", using high-quality components, an extruded aluminum case, and an acrylic front panel with a number of LED indicators. As the modem market expanded, competitors quickly copied the Hayes command set and often the Hayes industrial design as well. To compete with Hayes on price, early competitors manufactured modems using low-cost components that were often unreliable. Hayes quickly gained a reputation for high quality, and for a time held a 50% market share.

In 1982, at the Spring Comdex in Atlantic City, Hayes introduced the Bell 212-compatible Smartmodem 1200 for $699, the first practical all-in-one 1200 bit/s Bell 212-compatible modem. (Note: A widely circulated history of computing states that the Smartmodem 1200 was introduced in 1981. This "history" is confusing the Smartmodem 1200 with the original Smartmodem. Another confuses the original Smartmodem 9600 with the later V-Series modems, reversing the introduction dates and features.) The earlier design was redesignated the Smartmodem 300. At the time, Hayes was one of the few modem companies with the capital and engineering wherewithal to develop entirely new modem architectures. However, this was only a limited competitive advantage, since it was not long before companies offering Hayes "clones" introduced derivative 1200 bit/s models of their own.

The 1200 bit/s market existed for a relatively short time; in 1984 the CCITT introduced the V.22bis standard for 2400 bit/s operation. This was the first time that the CCITT's standard predated Bell's introductions, avoiding compatibility issues that had plagued earlier standards. Modem companies quickly incorporated V.22bis into their product lines. Hayes was no exception; the company introduced its V.22bis Smartmodem 2400 at US$549 in 1985 (the 1200 bit/s Smartmodem also remained available at a lower price). Competition drove prices rapidly downward, and by 1987 a clone 2400 bit/s modem was generally available for around US$250. After 1987, modems increasingly became a commodity item.

== Hayes '302 ==
In June 1983, Hayes and a number of other manufacturers were sent licensing demands by a smaller modem manufacturer, BizComp, who had filed a patent in 1980 but only received it in 1983. The patent covered the use of an escape sequence to switch between command and data mode, just like the Smartmodem. BizComp had already implemented the system in its modems in 1980, a year before the Smartmodem came to market. It offered a sliding scale of terms; an outright license was $2 million, but it would accept as little as $500,000 with additional per-unit fees. Hayes responded by licensing the patent outright for $2 million (equivalent to $5,278,000 in 2024).

Hayes themselves also had a patent filing working its way through the system since 1981, although it mentioned the escape system and modes only in passing. Having obtained a license, it re-wrote its patent to include a lengthy section on the idea of a guard time, which the original Bizcomp patent lacked. They received the patent, 4,549,302 Modem With Improved Escape Sequence With Guard Time Mechanism, in October 1985.

Hayes began sending bills to other manufacturers, charging 2% of the retail price per modem that followed the Hayes system, including those modems that had already been built and sold. This resulted in a number of companies launching a patent review, claiming the concept had long been used in the industry. A flurry of suits and countersuits followed. The bid to overturn the patent failed in 1986. Some time later, Hayes received permission to bring suits in federal court against infringers, and filed an initial suit against several major manufacturers, Everex, Ven-Tel, Omnitel and Prometheus Products.

Competitors derisively termed it the "modem tax", and a number of manufacturers banded together and introduced the Time Independent Escape Sequence, or TIES, but it was not as robust as Heatherington's system and never became very successful.

== Higher speeds and increased competition ==
Hayes was not as fast as some other manufacturers to release modems that ran faster than 2400 bit/s, which opened the door for USRobotics (USR) and Telebit to meet market demand with faster products. Telebit was the fastest, running up to ~18,500 bit/s and maintaining higher speeds on noisy lines where other models would fall back to lower speeds. They were also expensive and found mostly in professional settings, notably for Unix-running minicomputers for UUCP use where their protocol spoofing offered further speed improvements. USR's designs were simpler than Telebits and ran at "only" 9,600 bit/s, but carved out a strong niche by offering deep discounts to sysops.

In 1987 Hayes responded with the Hayes Express 96 protocol, a 9600 bit/s protocol. It was sometimes referred to as the "Ping-Pong" protocol due to the way the modems could "ping-pong" the single high-speed link between the two ends on demand, in a fashion similar to the USR and Telebit protocols. The key improvement is that the channel could be switched very rapidly, without a renegotiation procedure. However, Express 96 both was late to market and lacked error correction, making it far less attractive than its competition. The design was generally unsuccessful, and for the first time Hayes lost cachet as the leader in modem design and manufacture.

Hayes' slow entry into the high-speed market led to a fracturing of the command set. In order to set up the modem to accept or reject certain types of connections, Hayes had added a number of new commands prefixed by & (the ampersand) to the Smartmodem 2400. Other companies offering 2400 bit/s generally followed the same syntax. When Hayes moved to the Smartmodem 9600, it extended the set further, using the same syntax. However, by this time the other companies involved had introduced their own syntax; USR used an incompatible set of &-prefixed commands, Microcom used \, and Telebit was based on setting a series of registers. All of these survived for some time into the early 1990s.

Through the late 1980s and early 1990s, new standard high-speed modes were introduced by the CCITT. The first of these, V.32, offered 9600 bit/s in both directions at the same time, whereas earlier high-speed protocols were high-speed in one direction only. In 1988 Hayes effectively abandoned its Express 96 protocol in favor of V.32, which along with MNP support was built into the US$1199 Hayes V-series Smartmodem 9600. In 1990 the company introduced the Smartmodem Ultra 96, which offered both V.32 and Express 96 support, and added the new V.42bis error correction and compression system (in addition to MNP). V.32 modems remained fairly rare and expensive, although by 1990 third-party V.32 modems were available for approximately US$600.

== V.32bis ==
Almost immediately after the introduction of V.32, the CCITT began the process of standardizing a slightly faster variant, the 14,400 bit/s V.32bis. During previous speed bumps, the large companies like Hayes and USR were generally the first to respond with new models.

Not so in this case; shortly after V.32bis was ratified in 1991, Rockwell introduced a low-cost chipset supporting the new standard, along with similar V.32 and V.22bis (2400 bit/s) versions, all of which supported MNP, V.42bis and, optionally, 9600 bit/s V.29 fax modem capabilities. Their system was introduced commercially in the SupraFAXModem 14400, which went on to become a runaway bestseller. Soon there were hundreds of similar models on the market, and Rockwell's competitors also rushed in with similar chipsets of their own.

Hayes was never able to re-establish itself as a market leader through this period. In the fall of 1991 it introduced the US$799 Smartmodem Ultra 144 which also supported Express 96, but by this point, Express 96 had little cachet and the market was already flooded with lower-cost modems. It then split its line into the Accura and Optima brands, offering the Accura as a low-cost model, although the feature sets were not that different between the two lines. Hayes eventually purchased two of its competitors, Practical Peripherals and Cardinal Technologies, turning them into low-cost brands in order to compete with a flood of companies like Supra Corporation and Zoom Telephonics.

As speeds increased with the introduction of V.34 and V.90, Hayes increasingly became a follower rather than a leader. By the mid-1990s its modems were also based on the Rockwell chipset and had little to distinguish themselves from other vendors.

Oddly it was the Rockwell chipset that also re-standardized the various command sets back on the original high-speed ones introduced by Hayes. As the Rockwell-based systems became more and more common, other companies, like AT&T, introduced new versions of their modem chip sets with identical commands. Rockwell had taken its commands from the V-series Smartmodems, so by the mid-90s the market was once again based largely on a "real" Hayes command set.

== Decline and fall ==
Hayes realized that changes in the telephone networks would eventually render the modem, in its current form, obsolete. As early as 1985 he started efforts to produce consumer-ready ISDN "modems", betting the company on ISDN becoming a widespread standard—which was widely believed at the time. By the early 1990s, this was a major focus of the company.

However, unlike parts of Europe (mainly Germany) or Japan, ISDN simply never happened in the US consumer market. The whole model was based on end-to-end digital communications, and was thus limited to the speed of the long-distance carrier lines, either 56 or 64 kbit/s. The Bell companies were interested in deploying ISDN, but doing so required customer-end installations to make their conventional telephones work, which made the system unattractive for wide-scale deployment.

Additionally, the rise of the Internet in the mid-1990s made point-to-point communications far less interesting. After dialing their local Internet service provider, the user could "call out" at high speed to services around the world, so the need for long-distance data calls was generally eliminated. As a result of this shift, there was no real need to limit the user to the speed of the long-distance lines, giving the Bell companies flexibility in terms of what to install at the user's site. Their attention turned to Asymmetric Digital Subscriber Line (ADSL), which ran over the existing wiring and did not block a telephone connection in the process. The end-user was offered much higher speeds while still being able to use existing phones, with the added "benefit" of helping tie the user to the telephone company's own ISP.

Hayes, having bet the company on a system that was never actually deployed, had no new products in the pipeline. In an attempt at diversification in January 1991 it had acquired most of the assets of local area network software developer Waterloo Microsystems Inc of Waterloo, Ontario and belatedly entered the operating system (OS) market in June 1991 with LANstep, a network OS for small offices, but this was subsequently abandoned in 1994 in the face of stiff competition particularly from Novell NetWare. An effort was started to move into the market for ADSL and cable modems, but this was a multi-year effort during a period when USR increasingly took over what remained of the high-end modem market.

They entered Chapter 11 protection in November 1994, exiting in October 1995 as Hayes Corp. after selling 49% of the company to Nortel and a Singapore-based venture capital firm. In 1997 it merged with Access Beyond, a builder of ISP rack-mount modems and terminal servers, and changed the company name again, this time to Hayes Communications. The merger was primarily a way to take the company public. The stock started crashing over the next year, from around US$12 in early 1998 to pennies in October, when it once again filed for Chapter 11 protection. No new funding could be found, and in 1999 the company assets were liquidated.

The brand name was purchased and revived by onetime rival Zoom Telephonics in July 1999. Zoom continues to use the Hayes name on some of its products.
