= USRobotics =

Business enterprise

U.S. Robotics Corporation
- Type: Division
- Industry: Computer
- Founded: 1976; 50 years ago
- Headquarters: Schaumburg, Illinois, U.S.
- Products: Modems, Wired and Wireless Networking, VoIP
- Parent: UNICOM Global
- Website: www.usr.com

U.S. Robotics Corporation, often called USR, is a company that produces USRobotics computer modems and related products. Its initial marketing was aimed at bulletin board systems, where its high-speed HST protocol made FidoNet transfers much faster. During the 1990s it became a major consumer brand with its Sportster line. The company had a reputation for high quality and support for the latest communications standards as they emerged, notably in its V.Everything line, released in 1996.

With the reduced usage of voiceband modems in North America in the early 21st century, USR began branching out into new markets. The company purchased Palm, Inc. for its Pilot PDA, but was itself purchased by 3Com soon after. 3Com spun off USR again in 2000, keeping Palm and returning USR to the now much smaller modem market. After 2004 the company is formally known as USR. USR is now a division of UNICOM Global, and is one of the few providers left in the modem market today. The division employs about 125 people worldwide.

== History ==
USR was founded in 1976 in Chicago, Illinois (and later moved to Skokie, Illinois), by a group of entrepreneurs, including Casey Cowell, who served as CEO for most of the company's history, and Paul Collard who designed modems into the mid-1980s. The company name is a reference to the fictional company U.S. Robots and Mechanical Men which featured prominently in the works of Isaac Asimov. The company has stated it was named as an homage to Asimov because in his science fiction works U.S. Robots eventually became "the greatest company in the known galaxy", and USR appeared in I, Robot (2004) as the fictional company itself.

In its early years (circa 1980), USR was a reseller of computers, terminals and modems. At the time, commonly available modems ran at 300 bit/s, but 1200 bit/s using the mutually incompatible Bell 212A and V.22 standards were available at much higher price points. Even in 1983, 300 bit/s remained the most common speed. In 1984, the V.22bis standard provided 2400 bit/s service, but these remained high-cost devices.

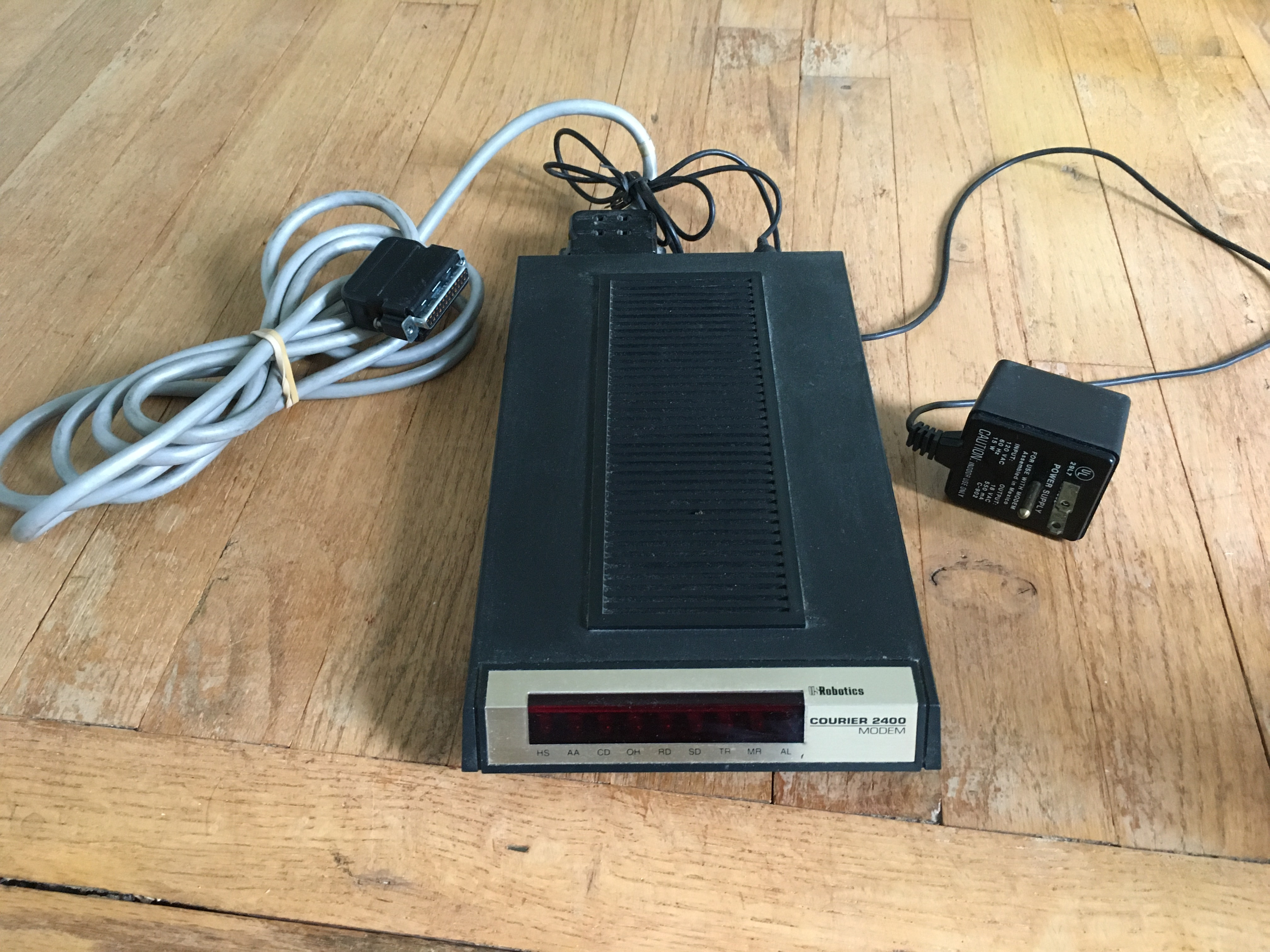
USRobotics Courier 2400 Modem with serial cable attached (mid-late 1980s)

USR sold its first modem, the Courier, to corporate customers starting in 1979. In 1984, the breakup of AT&T greatly lowered the cost of the testing needed for connection to the telephone network, which led to lower prices and wider use of modems. It began offering the Courier to the public in 1984.

In 1986, USR introduced their Courier HST, short for "High Speed Technology". Using trellis encoding, HST provided 9,600 bit/s speeds, leapfrogging the standards efforts and offering four times the performance for about twice the price of a 2400 bit/s model. In 1989 HST was expanded to 14.4 kbit/s, 16.8 kbit/s in 1992, and finally to 21 kbit/s and 24 kbit/s.

USR was not the only company making modems with proprietary protocols; Telebit's TrailBlazer series of 1985 offered speeds up to 19.2 kbit/s, and Hayes also introduced the 9600 bit/s Express 96 (or "Ping-Pong") system. However, USR became the most successful of the three, due to a marketing scheme that offered large discounts to BBS sysops. It was a favourite in this market not only for its performance, but its superb stability, with sysops suggesting new sysops "Just get the Courier, you will NOT be disappointed, it is excellent."

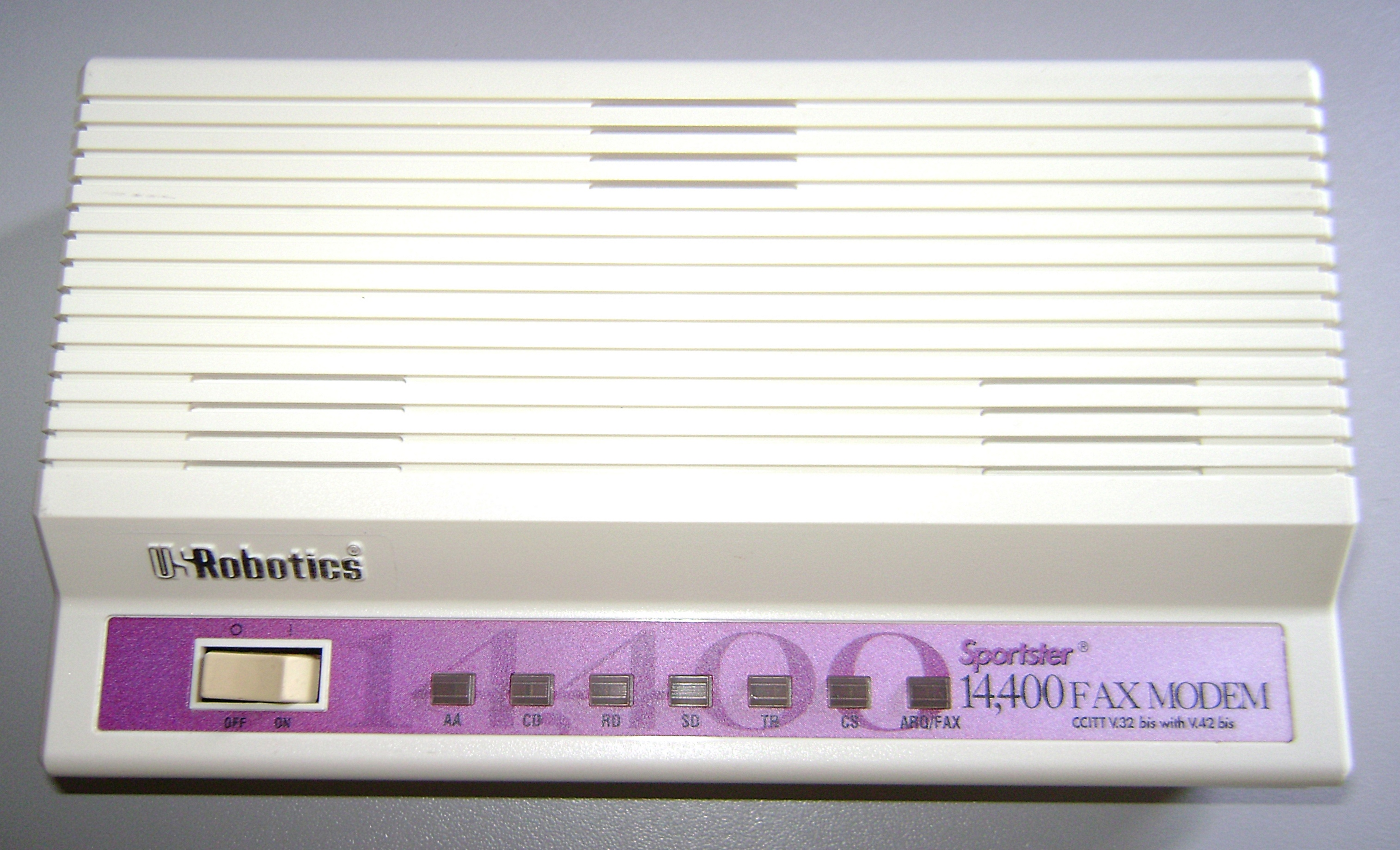
U.S. Robotics Sportster 14,400 Fax Modem (1994)

The proprietary nature of HST allowed USR to maintain its market predominance even when off-brand V.32-based modems began selling for less than equivalent HST modems. As the price differential decreased, however, V.32-based modems eventually became a cost-effective alternative to HST. USR countered by creating ever-faster HST protocols, starting with a 14.4 kbit/s mode, and by producing "Dual Standard" modems that were able to communicate with both HST and V.32 modems at high speeds. Due to many modems with similar performance on the market at even lower price points, the Courier's advertising focused on quality and reliability, "Once you have used a Courier, nothing else is a modem in your book at any price. They are the very best there is."

To compete with the ever growing market for low cost consumer models, USR introduced their Sportster line. These supported only V.32 and later standards, they retained their own higher-speed HST standard only for the Couriers. During this time, Couriers were available in V.32, HST, or the more popular Courier Dual Standard models which supported both. The Sportster used the same motherboard as the Couriers, and on certain 14.4 kbit/s models a sequence of AT commands could be issued to enable the faster 16.8 kbit/s HST mode. The Courier modems remained a favorite in the BBS and emerging Internet service provider world, where they were known to run without problems for extended periods of time (although the initial large-scale deployment of Courier modems in the CompuServe network uncovered a serious bug, which would cause the modems to crash and stop answering calls under high call volumes).

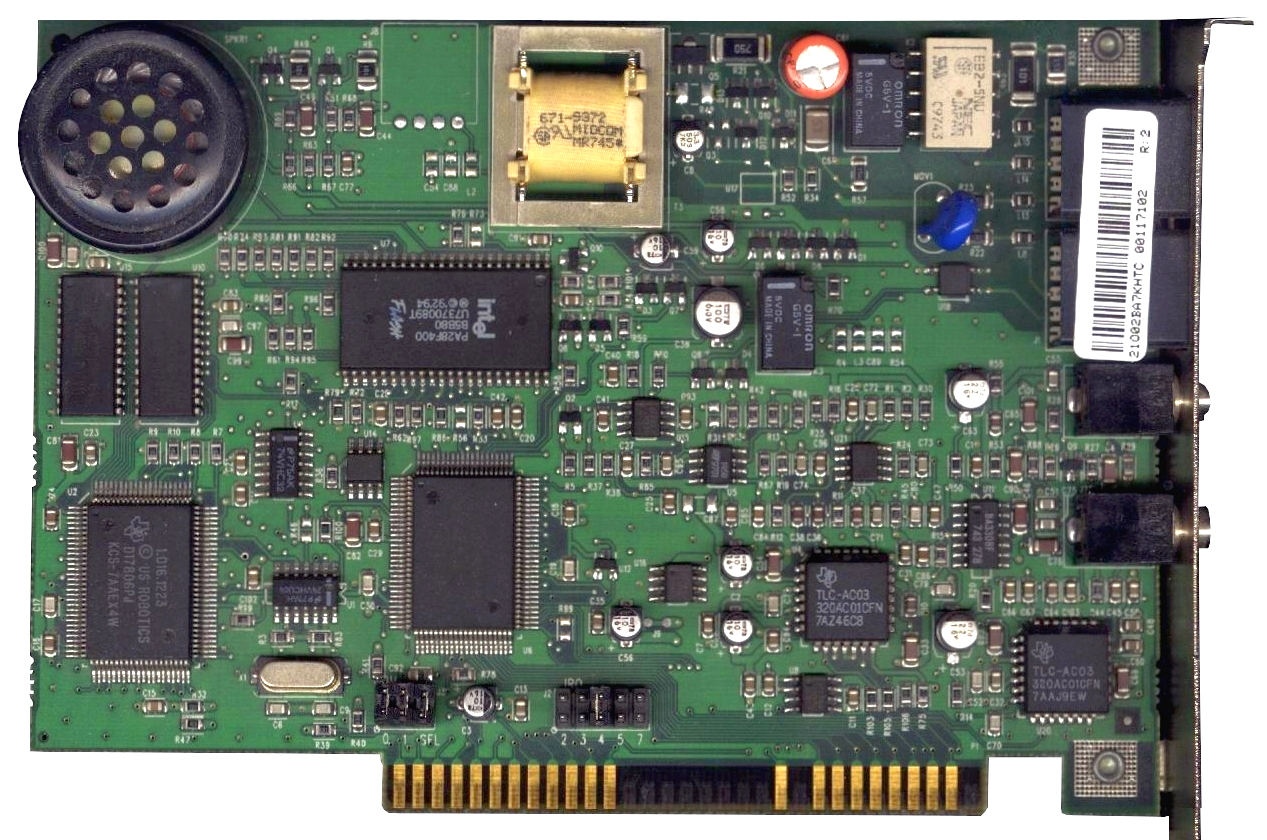
USR Sportster 56k 117102 ISA modem supporting X2 and V.90

A similar situation emerged a few years later when the 56 kbit/s V.90 standard was first being proposed. USR developed its own 56k standard known as X2, while a consortium of other companies introduced its own K56flex. In contrast to the success of HST, neither X2 nor K56flex saw any real market uptake, as it was clear they would soon be followed by V.90 modems. After the introduction of V.90, USR abandoned support for X2. In a further effort to reduce the retail price of its modems, USR also marketed a Winmodem that used software running on the host computer to perform some of the modem functions.

Some models of Courier modems were known for their long-term upgradeability, because they used an upgradeable DSP design. For example, when the Courier V.Everything modem was first released in 1994 under the product label "Courier V.34 Ready"., it shipped with only V.FC support, because V.34 had not been released. A free V.34 firmware upgrade was made available later via FidoNet, as well as the Internet. USR then surprised many early Courier V.Everything modem owners with a limited-time free offer of an X2 firmware upgrade, which added 56K speed capability. Finally, USR released a V.90 upgrade that was compatible with X2-upgraded Courier V.Everything modems. Even the 1994 hardware released pre-V.34 was fully V.90-upgradeable without hardware modification.

There was a licensing key needed for some Courier V.Everything V.90 flash upgrades. The firmware could be loaded onto the modem, but it would work in "degraded" V.34 mode. After paying a fee, and having the modem dial USR, a license key was installed that enabled the V.90 functions.

== Commoditization ==
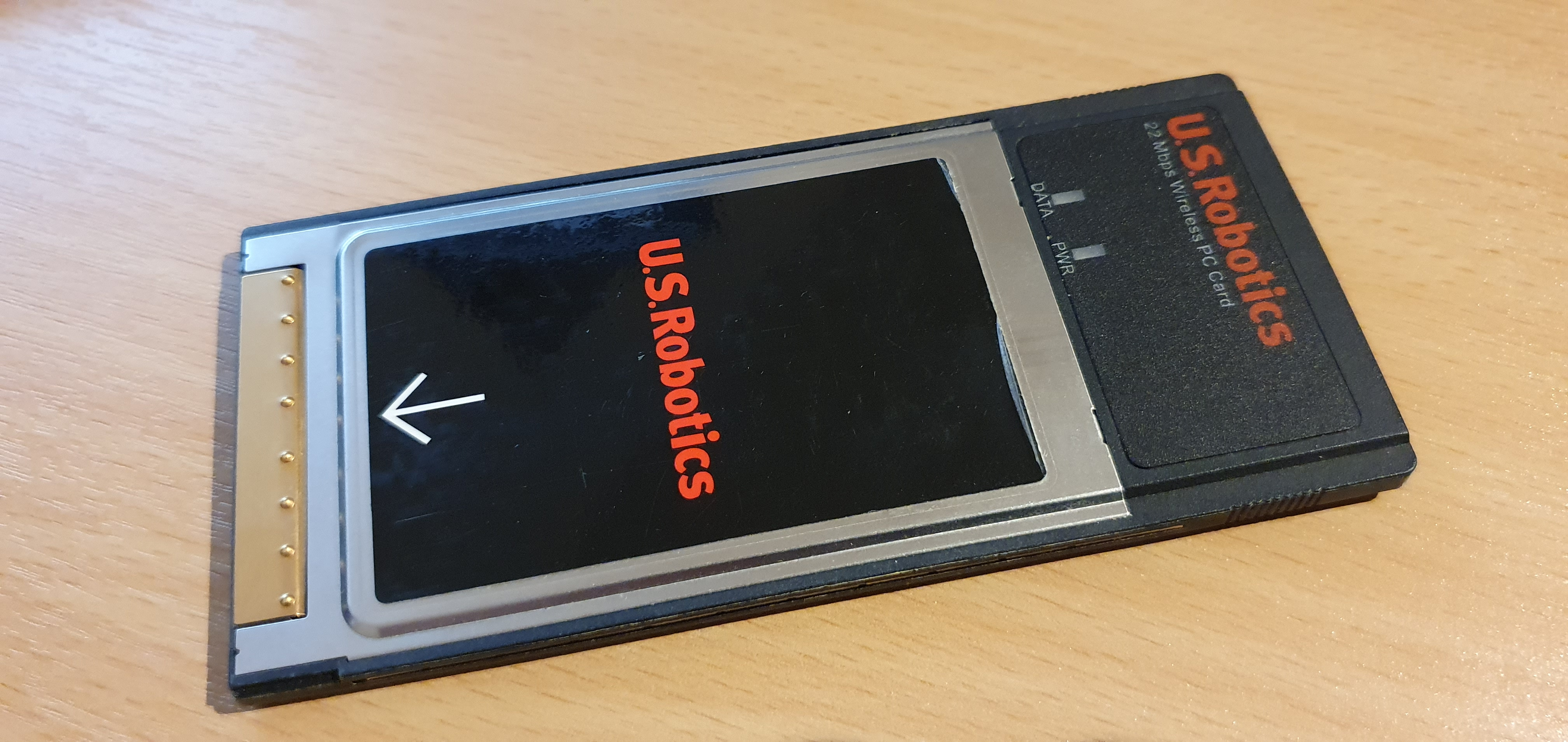
U.S. Robotics 22Mbit/s Wireless PC Card (2002)

USR acquired Palm, Inc. in 1995 and subsequently merged with 3Com Corporation in June 1997. It was then recreated as a spin-off of 3Com in June 2000, assuming 3Com's entire client modem business except for the Palm-related portion, which itself had been spun off with Palm three months earlier. Other portions of the original USR remained part of 3Com as the CommWorks Corporation. USR then quickly built up its device portfolio, including not only traditional dial-up modems, but also wired- and wireless-networking components.

USR was acquired by private equity firm Platinum Equity for an undisclosed amount of cash in 2005, believed to be between US$30 million and US$50 million.

By 2010 the company was focused only on the traditional modem business.

In 2013, USR was acquired by UNICOM Global.

== See also ==
- IBM Mwave – Combined modem and sound digital signal processor (DSP) card allowing soft upgrades within its hardware limitations.
