= Dial-up Internet access =

Access to the Internet via telephone line

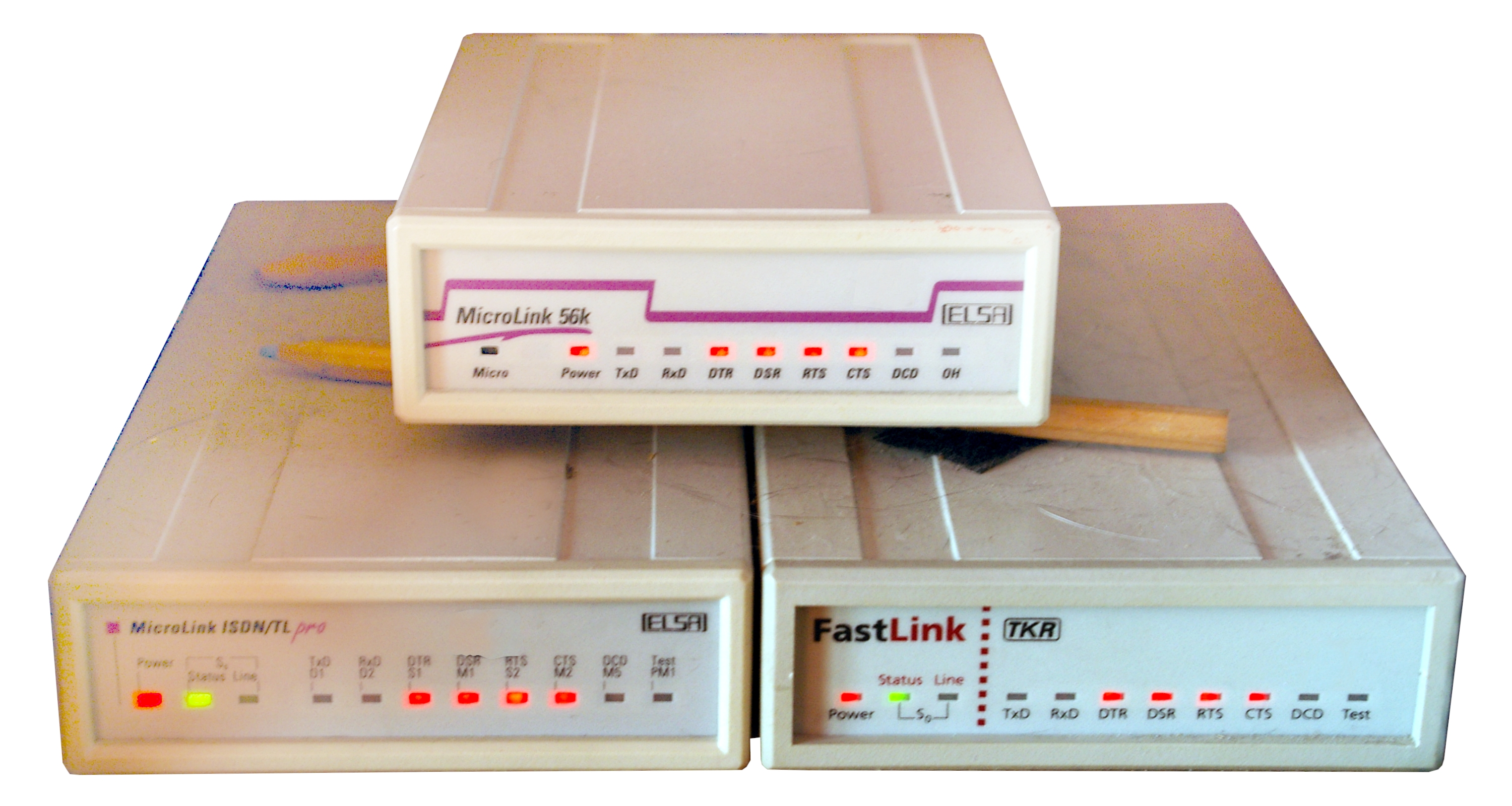
An array of modems used to accept incoming calls for dialing-up to the Internet

"Dial up modem noises"
Typical noises of dial-up modem (North America and United Kingdom) while a modem is establishing a connection with a local ISP server in order to get access to the public Internet.

Dial-up Internet access is a form of Internet access that uses the facilities of the public switched telephone network (PSTN) to establish a connection to an Internet service provider (ISP) by dialing a telephone number on a conventional telephone line which could be connected using an RJ-11 connector. Dial-up connections use modems to decode audio signals into data to send to a router or computer, and to encode signals from the latter two devices to send to another modem at the ISP. The term also applies to legacy cellular data connections.

Dial-up Internet reached its peak popularity during the dot-com bubble. This was in large part because broadband Internet did not become widely used until well into the 2000s. Since then, most dial-up access has been replaced by broadband.

== History ==
Dial-up Internet access has existed since the 1980s via public providers such as NSFNET-linked universities in the United States. In the United Kingdom, JANET linked academic users, including a connection to the ARPANET via University College London, while Brunel University and the University of Kent offered dial-up UUCP to non-academic users in the late 1980s.

Commercial dial-up Internet access was first offered in 1989 in the US by the software development company Software Tool & Die, with their service called "The World". Sprint and AT&T in 1992 also began offering internet access, along with Pipex in the United Kingdom. After the introduction of commercial broadband in the late 1990s, dial-up became less popular. In the United States, the availability of dial-up Internet access dropped from 40% of Americans in the early 2000s to 3% in the early 2010s. It is still used where other forms are not available or where the cost is too high, as in some rural or remote areas.

== Modems ==
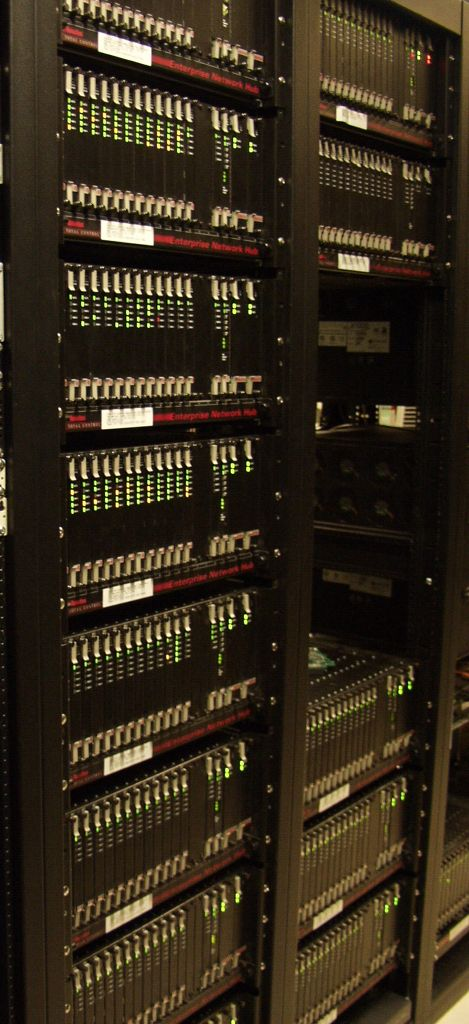
Banks of modems used by an ISP to provide dial-up Internet service

Because there was no technology to allow different carrier signals on a telephone line at the time, dial-up Internet access relied on using audio band communication. A modem would take the digital data from a computer, modulate it into an audio signal and send it to a receiving modem. This receiving modem would demodulate the analogue signal and convert it back into digital data for the computer.

Use of the existing circuit switching telephone network meant that people would be unable to use their phone line for verbal communication until the Internet call was finished.

The Internet speed using this technology can drop to 21.6 kbit/s or less. Poor condition of the telephone line, high noise level and other factors all affect dial-up speed. For this reason, it is popularly called the "21600 syndrome".

== Availability ==
Dial-up connections to the Internet require no additional infrastructure other than the telephone network and the modems and servers needed to make and answer the calls. Because telephone access is widely available, dial-up is often the only choice available for rural or remote areas, where broadband installations are not prevalent due to low population density and high infrastructure cost.

A 2008 Pew Research Center study stated that only 10% of US adults still used dial-up Internet access. The study found that the most common reason for retaining dial-up access was high broadband prices. Users cited lack of infrastructure as a reason less often than stating that they would never upgrade to broadband. That number had fallen to 6% by 2010, and to 3% by 2013.

A survey conducted in 2018 estimated that 0.3% of Americans were using dial-up by 2017.

The CRTC estimated that there were 336,000 Canadian dial-up users in 2010.

== Replacement by broadband ==
Broadband Internet access via cable, digital subscriber line, wireless broadband, mobile broadband, satellite and FTTx has replaced dial-up access in many parts of the world. Broadband connections typically offer speeds of 700 kbit/s or higher for two-thirds more than the price of dial-up on average. In addition, broadband connections are always on, thus avoiding the need to connect and disconnect at the start and end of each session. Broadband does not require the exclusive use of a phone line, and thus one can access the Internet and at the same time make and receive voice phone calls without having a second phone line.

However, many rural areas remain without high-speed Internet, despite the eagerness of potential customers. This can be attributed to population, location, or sometimes ISPs' lack of interest due to little chance of profitability and high costs to build the required infrastructure. Some dial-up ISPs have responded to the increased competition by lowering their rates and making dial-up an attractive option for those who merely want email access or basic Web browsing.

Dial-up has seen a significant fall in usage, with the potential to cease to exist in the future as more users switch to broadband. In 2013, only about 3% of the U.S population used dial-up, compared to 30% in 2000. One contributing factor is the bandwidth requirements of newer computer programs, like operating systems and antivirus software, which automatically download sizeable updates in the background when a connection to the Internet is first made. These background downloads can take several minutes or longer and, until all updates are completed, they can severely impact the amount of bandwidth available to other applications like Web browsers.

Since an "always on" broadband is the norm expected by most newer applications being developed, this automatic background downloading trend is expected to continue to eat away at dial-up's available bandwidth to the detriment of dial-up users' applications. Many newer websites also now assume broadband speeds as the norm, and when connected to with slower dial-up speeds may drop (timeout) these slower connections to free up communication resources. On websites that are designed to be more dial-up friendly, use of a reverse proxy prevents dial-ups from being dropped as often but can introduce long wait periods for dial-up users caused by the buffering used by a reverse proxy to bridge the different data rates.

Despite the rapid decline, dial-up Internet still exists in some rural areas, and many areas of developing and underdeveloped nations, although wireless and satellite broadband are providing faster connections in many rural areas where fibre or copper may be uneconomical.

In 2010, it was estimated that there were 800,000 dial-up users in the UK. BT turned off its dial-up service in 2013.

In 2012, it was estimated that 7% of Internet connections in New Zealand were dial-up. One NZ (formerly Vodafone) turned off its dial-up service in 2021.

AOL discontinued its dial-up internet service on 30 September 2025 after thirty-four years of operation, following an announcement a month earlier. It is estimated that over 163,000 to 175,000 people still used dial up in 2025 before shutting down in the U.S.

== Performance ==
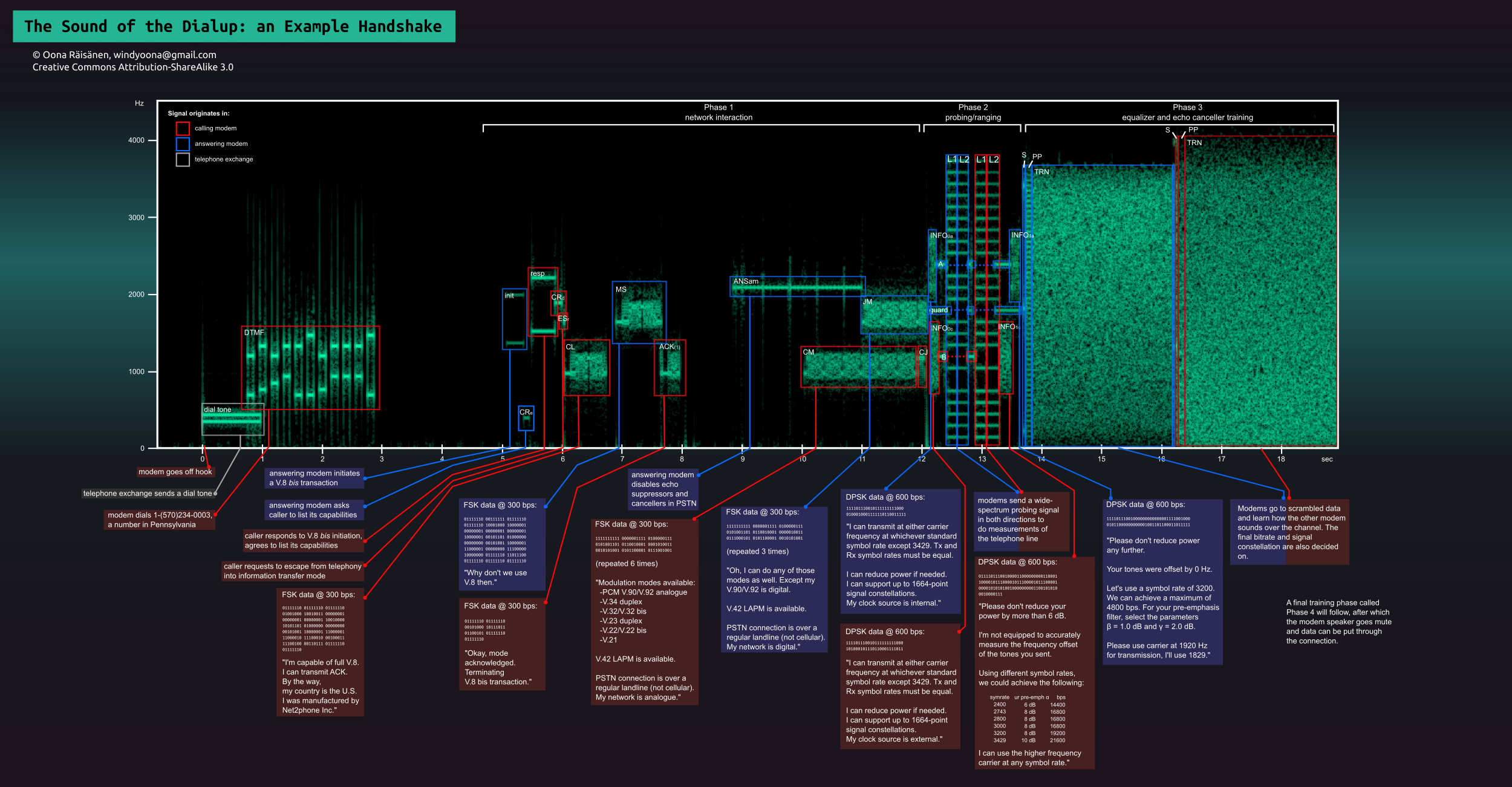
An example handshake of a dial-up modem

Modern dial-up modems typically have a maximum theoretical transfer speed of 56 kbit/s (using the V.90 or V.92 protocol), although in most cases, 40–50 kbit/s is the norm. Factors such as phone line noise as well as the quality of the modem itself play a large part in determining connection speeds.

Some connections may be as low as 21.6 kbit/s in extremely noisy environments, such as in a hotel room where the phone line is shared with many extensions, or in a rural area, many kilometres from the phone exchange. Other factors such as long loops, loading coils, pair gain, electric fences (usually in rural locations), and digital loop carriers can also slow connections to 21.6 kbit/s or lower. Because of this, it was nicknamed "21600 Syndrome".

The values given are maximum values, and actual values may be slower under certain conditions (for example, noisy phone lines).

Connection	Bitrate
110 baud (Bell 101)	0.11 kbit/s	(110 bits per second)
300 baud (Bell 103 or V.21)	0.3 kbit/s
1200 baud (Bell 212A or V.22)	1.2 kbit/s
2400 baud (V.22bis)	2.4 kbit/s
2400 baud (V.26bis)	2.4 kbit/s
4800 baud (V.27ter)	4.8 kbit/s
9600 baud (V.32)	9.6 kbit/s
14.4 kbit/s (V.32bis)	14.4 kbit/s
28.8 kbit/s (V.34)	28.8 kbit/s
33.6 kbit/s (V.34)	33.6 kbit/s
56k kbit/s (V.90)	56.0 to 33.6 kbit/s
56k kbit/s (V.92)	56.0 to 48.0 kbit/s
ISDN	64.0 to 128.0 kbit/s
Hardware compression (V.92/V.44)	56.0 to 320.0 kbit/s	(variable)
Server-side web compression	200.0 to 1000.0 kbit/s	(variable)

V.90 – 3Com USR - 56k

V.90 – RockWeller - 56k

ZyXEL Omni 56K

V.90 – Momenta 56DSP

V.34 – Sindrome 21600

V.80 – Helicopter

V.34 – RockWeller - 33.6k

V.92 – ElCom HSP PCI Fax modem - 56k

[The dial-up sounds are] a choreographed sequence that allowed these digital devices to piggyback on an analog telephone network. A phone line carries only the small range of frequencies in which most human conversation takes place: about three hundred to three thousand hertz. The modem works within these [telephone network] limits in creating sound waves to carry data across phone lines. What you're hearing is the way 20th century technology tunneled through a 19th century network; what you're hearing is how a network designed to send the noises made by your muscles as they pushed around air came to transmit anything [that can be] coded in zeroes and ones.

— Alexis Madrigal, paraphrasing Glenn Fleishman

Analog telephone lines are digitally switched and transported inside a Digital Signal 0 once reaching the telephone company's equipment. Digital Signal 0 is 64 kbit/s and reserves 8 kbit/s for signaling information; therefore a 56 kbit/s connection is the highest that will ever be possible with analog phone lines.

Dial-up connections usually have latency as high as 150 ms or even more, higher than many forms of broadband, such as cable or DSL, but typically less than satellite connections. Longer latency can make video conferencing and online gaming difficult, if not impossible. An increasing amount of Internet content such as streaming media will not work at dial-up speeds.

Video games released from the mid-1990s to the mid-2000s that utilized Internet access such as EverQuest, Red Faction, Warcraft 3, Final Fantasy XI, Phantasy Star Online, Guild Wars, Unreal Tournament, Halo: Combat Evolved, Quake 3: Arena, Starsiege: Tribes and Ragnarok Online, etc., accommodated for 56k dial-up with limited data transfer between the game servers and user's personal computer. The first consoles to provide Internet connectivity, the Dreamcast and PlayStation 2, supported dial-up as well as broadband. The GameCube could use dial-up and broadband connections, but this was used in very few games and required a separate adapter. The original Xbox exclusively required a broadband connection, as did every major home console released since 2006 (via direct Ethernet connection or Wi-Fi).

=== Using compression to exceed 56k ===
The V.42, V.42bis and V.44 standards allow modems to accept compressed data at a rate faster than the line rate. These algorithms use data compression to achieve higher throughput.

For instance, a 53.3 kbit/s connection with V.44 can transmit up to 53.3 × 6 = 320 kbit/s if the offered data stream can be compressed that much. However, the compression ratio varies considerably. ZIP archives, JPEG images, MP3, video, etc. are already compressed. A modem might be sending compressed files at approximately 50 kbit/s, uncompressed files at 160 kbit/s, and pure text at 320 kbit/s, or any rate in this range.

==== Compression by the ISP ====
As telephone-based Internet lost popularity by the mid-2000s, some Internet service providers such as TurboUSA, Netscape, CdotFree, and NetZero started using data compression to increase the perceived speed. As an example, EarthLink advertises "surf the Web up to 7x faster" using a compression program on images, text/HTML, and SWF flash animations prior to transmission across the phone line.

The pre-compression operates much more efficiently than the on-the-fly compression of V.44 modems. Typically, website text is compacted to 5%, thus increasing effective throughput to approximately 1000 kbit/s, and JPEG/GIF/PNG images are lossy-compressed to 15–20%, increasing effective throughput up to 300 kbit/s.

The drawback of this approach is a loss in quality, where the graphics acquire compression artifacts taking on a blurry or colorless appearance. However, the transfer speed is dramatically improved. If desired, the user may choose to view uncompressed images instead, but at a much slower load rate. Since streaming music and video are already compressed at the source, they are typically passed by the ISP unaltered.

== Cellular data ==
Legacy 2G cellular data connections such as Circuit Switched Data (CSD) also used dial-up as the method of connecting to a data or internet service.

== See also ==
- Online service provider
- Registered jack
- Ascend Communications made equipment for Dial-Up ISPs
