= Popcom =

Former line of modems (1984–1989)

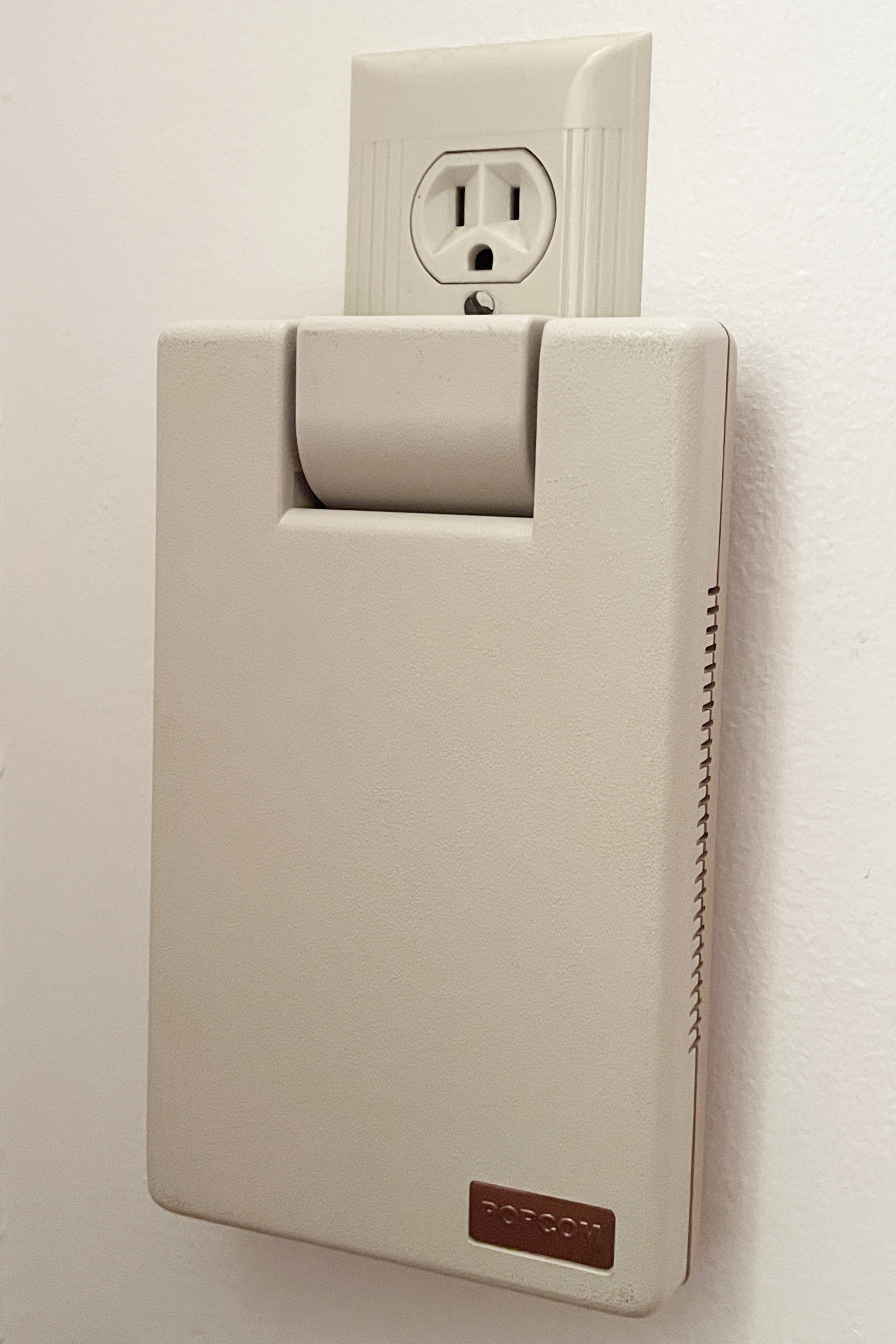
- A Popcom modem plugged into the wall
- Design firm: Prentice Communication; Telenetics (C200 and C250 only)
- Manufacturer: Prentice Communication
- Introduced: February 1984; 42 years ago
- Discontinued: 1989; 37 years ago
- Type: Modem
- Speed: 1,200 bit/s (X100, X150, C100, C150); 2,400 bit/s (C200, C250)

Popcom (an abbreviation of Popular Communications) was a line of modems marketed by the Prentice Corporation of Sunnyvale, California, introduced in 1984. The line comprised six models—X100, X150, C100, C150, C200, C250—the C models being internal modems meant to plug into a free ISA expansion slot of an IBM PC compatible, while the X models were compact external units intended to be plugged into a wall indefinitely and connected to the computer via a serial cable. The X100 and X150 were noted by the press for their very small physical footprint among its contemporaries in the market.

The whole line-up of modems were largely compatible with the Hayes command set for modem–computer communication, although Prentice programmed an extended feature set onto their ROMs, which allowed the modems to recover from temporary hiccups in transmissions and switch between voice communication and data transmission nearly on-the-fly. Although a successful product for Prentice, making the company one of the top manufacturers of modems for IBM PC compatibles, it could not save the company from filing for bankruptcy in 1989, after which the Popcom modem line was discontinued.

== Overview ==
=== X100 and X150 ===
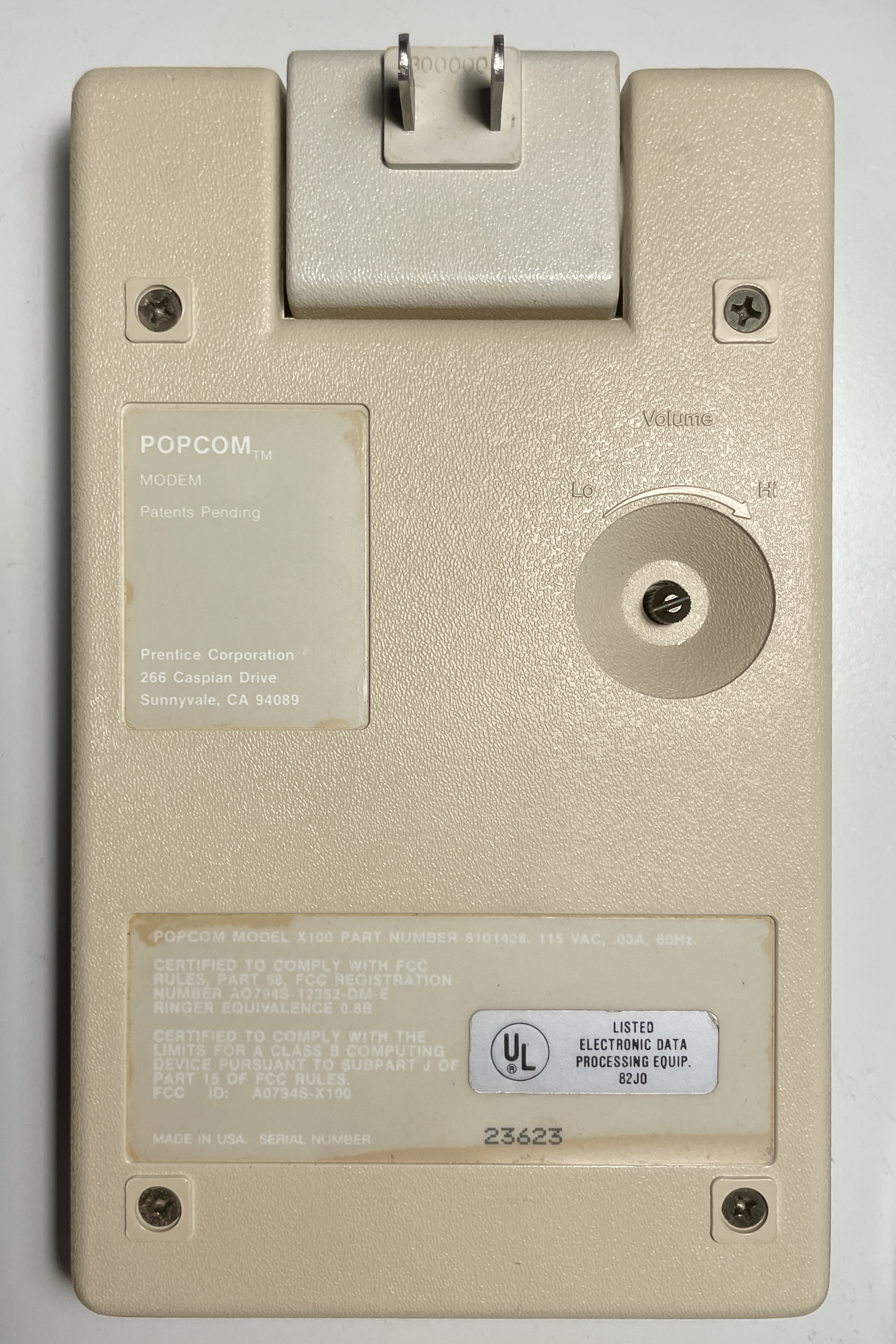
Back side of a Popcom modem. At top is the AC power plug, and at middle-right is the volume knob.

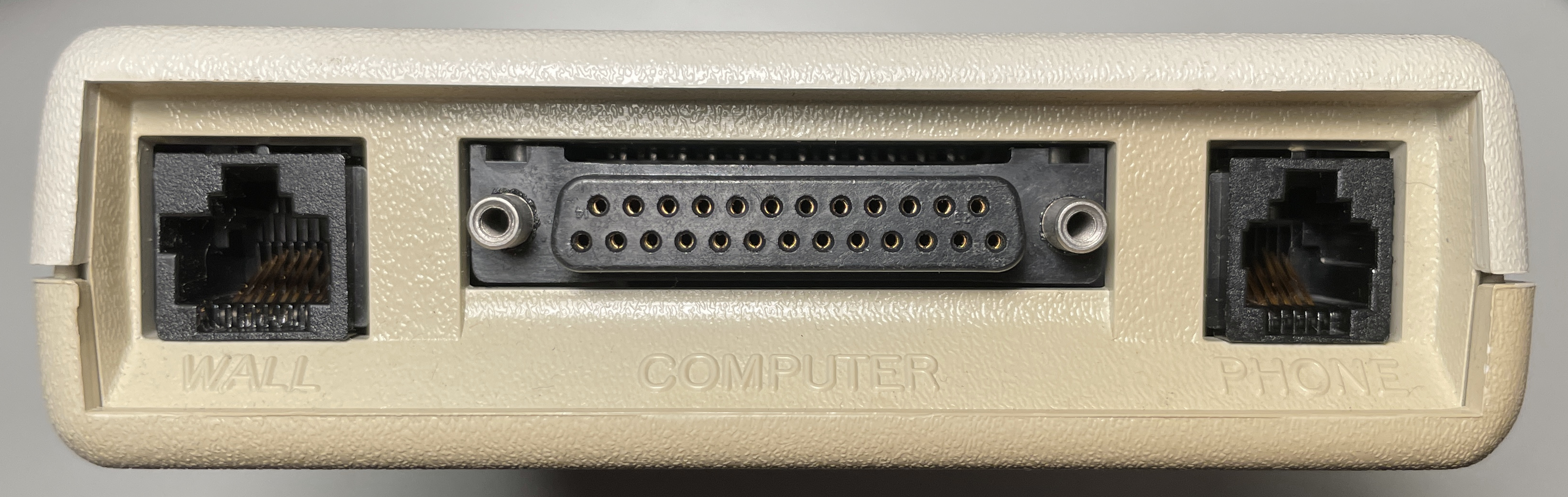
Bottom side of a Popcom modem. From left to right: wall phone jack, RS-232 serial port, handset jack

The X100—the flagship product in the Popcom range—is an external modem, housed in a beige plastic case with a built-in AC power adapter. Its two-pronged (non-polarized) plug is molded into a swiveled hinge, allowing it to hug the wall when the modem is plugged directly into a wall socket (the prongs perpendicular to the socket and the rest of the unit parallel) or be plugged into a power strip (the entire unit perpendicular to the strip). The three communications ports of the X100 include the RS-232 serial port (a female DB-25 connector), a modular 6P6C port for telephone handsets, and a modular 8P8C port that connects the X100 to the wall phone jack. The communications ports are located opposite the AC plug, or at the base of the modem when the modem is plugged into the wall. The X100 measures 7.8 by 4.7 by 1.6 inches (19.8 by 11.9 by 4.1 cm)—not including the plug, which contributes to 0.7 in to either the length or depth, depending on the direction it faces. The plug cannot fold down into the unit. A dimple in what is normally the rear of the unit contains a radial potentiometer in its center, which adjusts the volume of the modem's internal speaker. When the X100 is plugged into a wall socket, the speaker faces flush to the wall, so ventilation slots are included to let sound out through the sides of the unit.

The X100 otherwise contains no switches or status lights, not even for power. The only status indicators on the unit itself are provided through aural means, via short bursts of three touch tones generated from the speaker. Each burst indicates whether the user has correctly performed a step in the initialization process for the X100. The recommended order of operations to initialize the X100 is to first plug the modem into mains power, then to connect the X100 to the computer or terminal, and lastly to connect the X100 to the wall phone jack. If the user performs these steps out of order, several bursts of tones will sound together when the final connection has been made. Prentice intended for users to have the Popcom plugged into a live socket at all times; the X100 consumes about 4 watts of power on average, or the same as an average 1980s-era nightlight. Its minimalist design was intentionally inconspicuous, and being plugged into the wall meant saving desk space.

The X100 has a maximum transmission rate of 1,200 bit/s, switchable down to a maximum of 300 bit/s. It is compatible with both the Hayes command set and the Bell 212A modulation scheme. Prentice laid out three Hayes commands that could not be utilized by the X100, namely echoing and those pertaining to transmitting over amateur radio, but these were seldom used by the vast majority of personal computer users.

The X100 can transmit in one of two modes: in strict Hayes compatibility mode, in which the X100 only issues commands with the Hayes set, and in Popcom mode, which grants the X100 more advanced features. In Popcom mode, the modem can detect if it hears a human voice on the line, if it hears a Bell busy signal, and whether the system on the other end of the line is transmitting too fast or too slow for the Popcom to handle. Popcom mode also offers 19 additional command sets for tuning the number of seconds it will take for a data connection to be established before it times out; for tuning the number of seconds the transmission can tolerate in disruptions; for changing the escape sequence used by the Popcom to switch between transmitting and receiving; and so on.

Setting the tolerance for disruption length was useful, for example, for subscribers of telephone services who had call waiting service, a byproduct of which is the zip tone used to indicate an incoming call from another person during a preexisting call. Such a zip tone occurring during a data transmission usually proved fatal for the connection, but the Popcom could have carried on after such an interruption and continue receiving data, albeit with errors in the stream, which may have been correctable with error detection schemes and retransmission capabilities of some online services contemporary to the Popcom.

The human-voice detection capability allowed users to transmit data and speak to the recipient on the other end of the line within the same call. This was useful in the case of remote jobs that required debriefing before the transmission of data—sometimes multiple times in the same job. Performing both these duties, and being able to switch between the two, during the same call meant saving time and money, as placing multiple landline calls during the 1980s was sometimes a costly affair—especially for long-distance connections. This feature, however, was contingent on both the caller and the recipient having Popcom modems.

The X100's successor, the X150, was virtually identical to the X100. The X150 however came bundled with pfs:Access for MS-DOS, a terminal emulator by Software Publishing Corporation.

=== C100, C150, C200, and C250 ===
The C100, C150, C200, and C250 are internal models in the Popcom lineup, meant to plug into any ISA expansion slot of an IBM PC compatible. The C100 and C150, introduced in May 1985, are essentially reconfigured variants of the X100 and X150; like the X150, the only difference between the C100 and C150 is the pfs:Access software box that came with the purchase of the C150. The C100 and C150 too are limited to a maximum transmission rate of 1,200 bit/s. The C100 and C150 are both full-length, XT-case-height expansion cards, with Will R. Rosch of PC Magazine noticing a fair amount of bodge wires on the board, overall calling its design "obviously dated" by 1987.

The C200 and C250 by contrast was only five inches long and had a maximum transmission rate of 2,400 bit/s. Prentice commissioned the Japanese telecommunications company Telenetics for the design of the C200/C250, who in turn based their circuit design around a 2,400-bit/s modem chipset made by Rockwell. Each C200 and C250 were built as two circuit boards sandwiched together via pin headers and sockets; the sides of the boards where there are components face toward each other in this arrangement.

== Development and release ==
The Popcom family were the first retail products of Prentice Corporation, a Sunnyvale-based company who had a long history of manufacturing modems for large businesses since their foundation in 1963. The first entry in the Popcom line was the X100. The X100 was largely designed around a custom LSI chip designed for power efficiency, simplicity in user interaction, and reduction in the size of the modem. The X100 was announced in February 1984 and released to retail the following month, after Prentice had secured over fifty dealers to sell the modem. In January 1985, Prentice secured a deal with ComputerLand for the latter to vend the Popcom at all 675 of ComputerLand's then-active locations. That month Prentice also received $4.3 million in additional venture funding. In August 1985, Popcom signed an agreement with International MarketNet, a joint venture between IBM and Merrill Lynch that provided an early online stockbroking service, to distribute the Popcom among its customers.

== Reception and legacy ==
Stephen Satchell of InfoWorld called the Popcom X100 a "breeze to install" and attractive for users of portable computers in particular due to its small size. He wrote that it offers "extra features for 20 percent less than the Hayes Smartmodem 1200. And because it hangs on the wall, it should be of special interest to users who want to save desk space. We have some reservations, but transportable computer users who really transport their computers should look at this easy-to-pack modem." Writing in Microcomputing, Frank J. Derfler, Jr., said: "Popcom is going to be a significant challenger to the established modem marketplace. I recommend it to anyone contemplating a modem purchase." In PC Magazine, Derfler also wrote that, "[t]aken as a whole, the Popcom represents a major step forward for modems. The data/voice feature is useless for communicating with host computers or information utilities such as CompuServe ... but it's truly invaluable for exchanging data between microcomputers operated by people." Rosch, also in PC Magazine, was more critical, calling the X100/X150 "a refreshingly original design of doubtful practicality", noting that the Popcom would be liable to slip out of worn-out electrical sockets due to its heft. He singled out the C200/C250 for its high performance among the crop of modems reviewed that issue and gave it the Editor's Choice ranking. Bill Lamb of The Paris News praised the X100's easy of use and out-of-sight nature and wrote that, "[f]or its price and characteristics, the X100 is a step ahead of the pack, as far as modems are concerned."

Prentice continued selling the Popcom until 1989, when it dissolved in bankruptcy proceedings.
