= Satel =

Satel may refer to:

- Sally Satel (born 1956), American psychiatrist
- SATEL, Finnish radio networking technology manufacturer
- SAtel, Bangladeshi fixed-line telephone service provider
- Satel Film, Austrian TV and film production and distribution company

== See also ==
- Sattel, Switzerland, municipality in the canton of Schwyz
