= Morse system =

Communication system by RACOM

MORSE system is a unique communication system developed by RACOM. The system has been primarily designed for narrow band radio modems. However, it has been extended for the next communication channels afterwards: IP (any network using UDP/IP, e.g. Internet) and GPRS, EDGE, UMTS.

The system is used primarily for communication in SCADA & Telemetry, Fleet management and transaction & financial networks. There are more than 70 automation protocols implemented in MORSE system. Some of them are implemented in “cache mode”, when there is a mirror of data from all RTU in central modem. So the response time for SCADA is really fast.
