= ITU-T V.92 =

ITU-T recommendation for modems

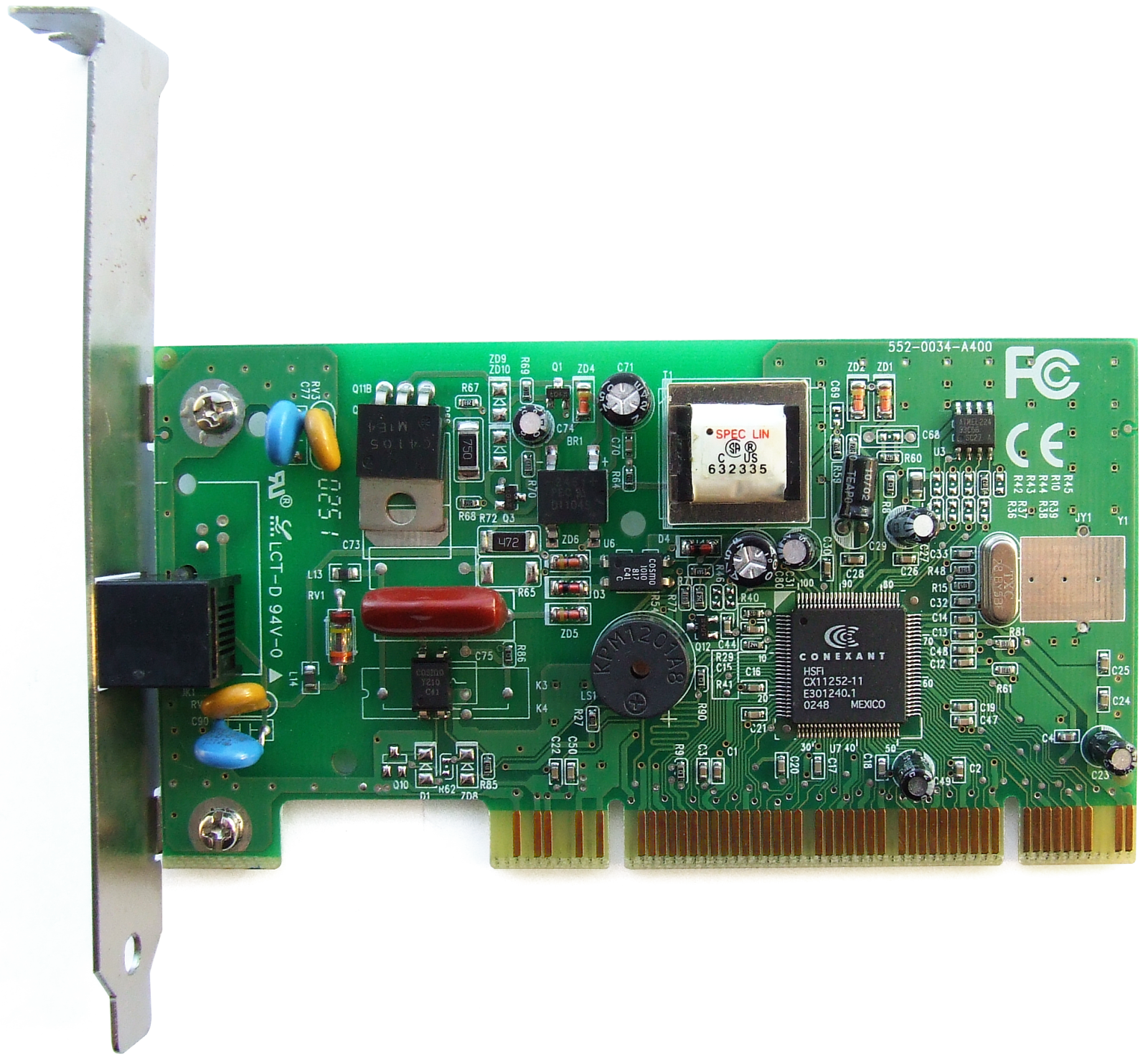
A PCI modem card capable of using the V.92 standard

V.92 is an ITU-T recommendation, titled Enhancements to Recommendation V.90, that establishes a modem standard allowing near 56 kb/s download and 48 kb/s upload rates. With V.92 PCM is used for both the upstream and downstream connections; previously 56K modems only used PCM for downstream data. The recommendation was issued in November 2000, with amendments in July 2001 and March 2002.

== New features ==
=== Quick connect ===
This reduces negotiation times to around 10 seconds instead of over 20 seconds. Quick connect works by training the client modem on the first call; analog and digital characteristics are stored in a local profile and then retrieved for future connections.

=== Modem on hold (MOH) ===
This allows the connection to be temporarily severed and then reconnected, reducing the possibility of dropped connections. This is particularly useful for lines that have call waiting.

=== PCM upstream ===
Pulse-code modulation (or PCM) allows higher rate digital transmissions over the analog phone lines. PCM upstream provides a digital connection for upstream data, reducing latency and allowing for a maximum upload speed of 48 kbit/s. Previously the speed was limited to a 33.6 kbit/s analog signal under the previous V.90.

=== V.44 compression ===
ITU-T V.44 compression replaces the existing V.42bis compression standards. It generally allows for between 10% and 120% better compression. In most situations the improvement is around 25%.

== See also ==
- Dial-up Internet access
- List of interface bit rates
