= Racom =

Czech radio and microwave transmission equipment company

- Industry: information and communications technology
- Founded: 10 April 1992
- Headquarters: Nové Město na Moravě, Czech Republic
- Revenue: 273,176,000 Czech koruna (2021)
- Operating income: 26,152,000 Czech koruna (2021)
- Net income: 20,721,000 Czech koruna (2021)
- Total assets: 325,784,000 Czech koruna (2021)
- Number of employees: 127 (2021)
- Website: www.racom.eu

RACOM is a Czech company specializing in design and production of radio modems, GPRS/EDGE/UMTS routers and microwave links. Its headquarters is located in Nové Město na Moravě in the Czech Republic.

== History ==
The core of company started even before the Velvet revolution in 1989 with design and production of equipment for radio amateurs. Radio modems for UHF and VHF licensed bands and wireless data networks became RACOM's main focus shortly afterwards, the first radio modem has been developed in 1991.

== Specialization ==
RACOM specializes to implement types of communication above to SCADA & Telemetry, Fleet management and transaction & financial networks.

RACOM has developed MORSE system where is possible to combine both technologies in one network.

== Communication protocols ==
There are many automation protocols implemented on user interfaces (RS-232, RS-485, RS-422, Ethernet) of RACOM equipment. The implementation is optimized for radio narrow band in terms of maximum throughput and for GPRS/EDGE/UMTS in terms of minimum data volume, which is charged by networks providers.
