= Bell 101 =

Commercial modem

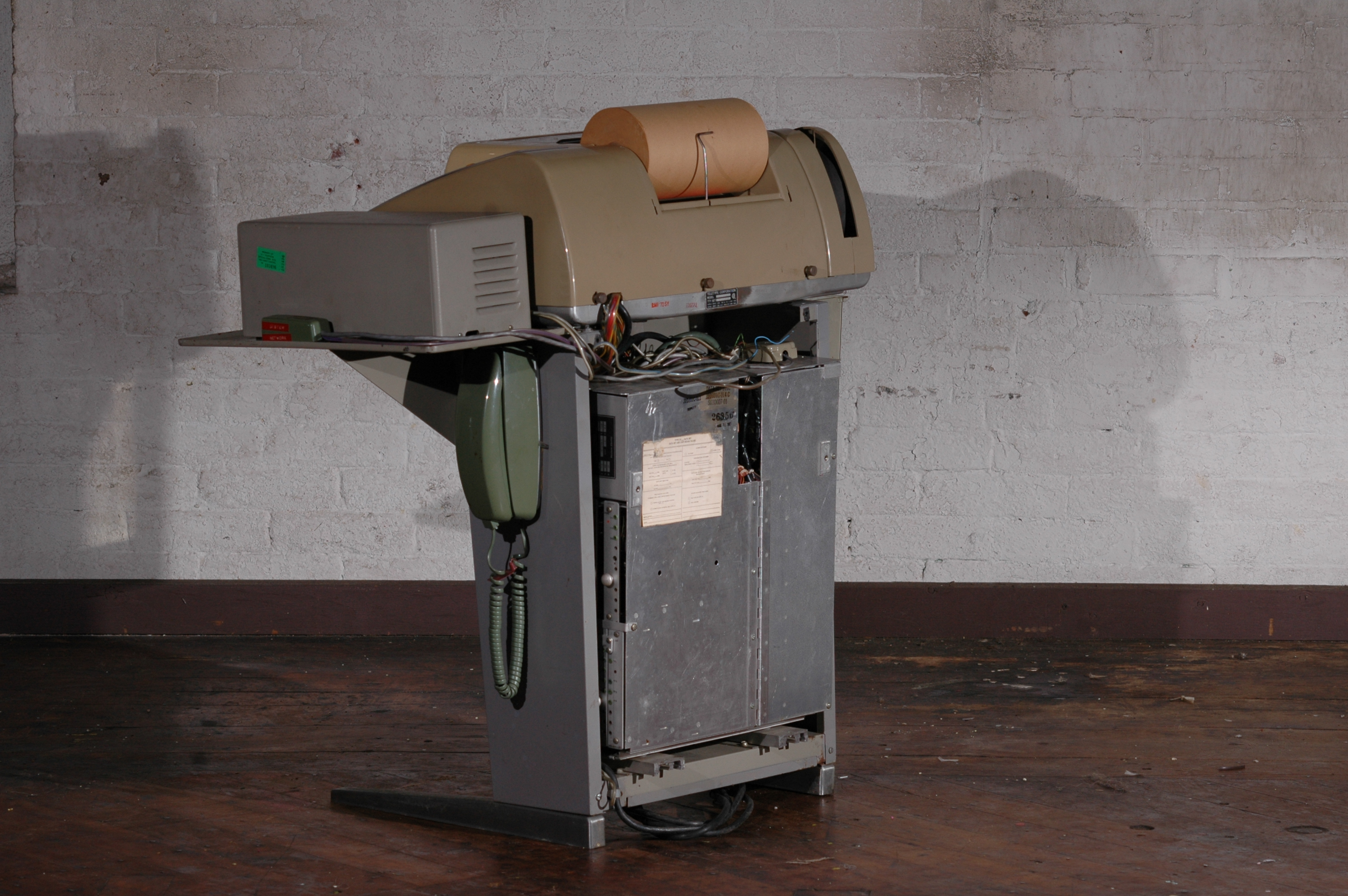
The back of a Teletype Model 33 teleprinter with a Bell 101C Data Set in the pedestal, 1963.

The Bell 101 Data Set was the first commercial modem for computers, released by AT&T Corporation in September 25, 1958 for use by SAGE, and made commercially available in 1959, shortly after AT&T's Bell Labs announced their 110 baud modulation frequencies. The Bell 101 allowed digital data to be transmitted over regular unconditioned telephone lines at a speed of 110 bits per second.

The Bell 101 modem used audio frequency-shift keying to encode data. Different pairs of audio frequencies were used by each station:

- The originating station used a mark tone of 1,270 Hz and a space tone of 1,070 Hz.
- The answering station used a mark tone of 2,225 Hz and a space tone of 2,025 Hz.

Bell 101 modems are no longer in use and were quickly replaced by its successor the Bell 103 modem. SAGE modems were described by AT&T's Bell Labs as conforming to the Bell 101 data set standard.

== See also ==
- List of interface bit rates
- Bell 202
