= Bell 103 =

Modem for computers released by AT&T in 1962

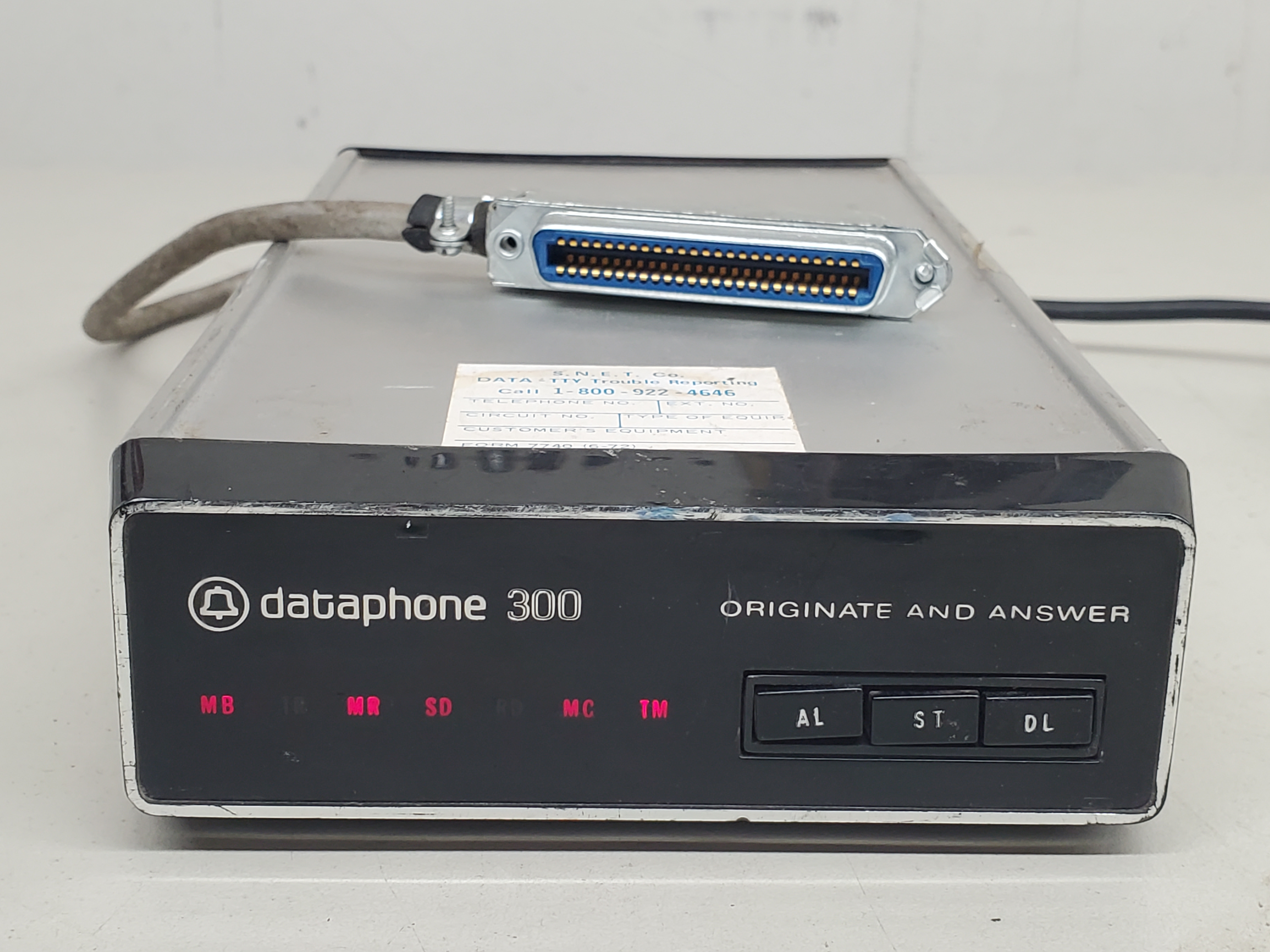
The Bell DataPhone 300 used the same protocol as the Bell 103. This modem is from 1978.

The Bell 103 modem or Bell 103 dataset was the second commercial modem for computers, released by AT&T Corporation in 1963. It allowed digital data to be transmitted over regular unconditioned telephone lines at a speed of 300 bits per second. It followed the introduction of the 110 baud Bell 101 dataset in 1958.

The Bell 103 modem used audio frequency-shift keying to encode data. Different pairs of audio frequencies were used by each station:

- The originating station used a mark tone of 1,270 Hz and a space tone of 1,070 Hz.
- The answering station used a mark tone of 2,225 Hz and a space tone of 2,025 Hz.

Although original Bell 103 modems are no longer in common use, this encoding scheme is referred to generically as "Bell 103 modulation", and any device employing it as "Bell 103-compatible" or "a Bell 103 modem".

For many years, higher-speed modems retained the ability to emulate the Bell 103, allowing a fallback method for data to be communicated at low speed if channel conditions deteriorated.

== Applications ==
Bell 103 modulation is still in use today, in shortwave radio, amateur radio, and some commercial applications. Its low signalling speed and use of audio frequencies makes it suitable for noisy or unreliable narrowband links.

One example was the CHU shortwave station in Ontario, Canada, which transmitted a Bell 103-compatible digital time code every minute. Bell 103 modulation is also the standard for amateur packet radio in the HF (shortwave) bands.

== Related technology ==
The ITU-T V.21 communications standard defines a very similar modulation scheme. Commercial 300 baud modems typically support both formats.

== In popular culture ==
The American synth-pop band Information Society featured a track entitled "300bps N, 8, 1 (Terminal Mode or Ascii Download)" on their album Peace and Love, Inc. that could be decoded to a text message by holding a phone handset connected to a Bell 103 modem up to the speaker playing the track.

== See also ==
- Bell 202 modem
- List of device bandwidths
