= Bell 212A =

Modulation scheme for data transmission

The Bell 212A modulation scheme defined a standard method of transmitting full-duplex asynchronous or synchronous serial data at 1200 bits per second (bit/s) over analogue transmission lines. The equivalent, but incompatible ITU-T standard is V.22.

== Device ==
The Bell 212 Dataset is a 1979-vintage modem used for communicating over telephone lines at 300 or 1200 bit/s. The 212A standard provides for the ability of a modem to auto-answer a ringing phone.

== Usage ==
The Bell 212A scheme was the most common standard used for 1200 bit/s transmission on US data networks such as CompuServe during the 1980s and 1990s, when dial-up access to time-sharing services was the norm, and, starting in 1989, dial-up Internet access.

== See also ==
- List of device bandwidths
