= Radio modem =

Radio modems are modems that transfer data wirelessly across a range of up to tens of kilometres. Using radio modems is a modern way to create Private Radio Networks (PRN). Private radio networks are used in critical industrial applications, when real-time data communication is needed. Radio modems enable users to be independent of telecommunication or satellite network operators. In most cases users use licensed frequencies either in the UHF or VHF bands. In certain areas licensed frequencies may be reserved for a given user, thus ensuring that there is less likelihood of radio interference from other radio frequency transmitters. Also licence free frequencies are available in most countries, enabling easy implementation, but at the same time other users may use the same frequency, thus making it possible that a given frequency is blocked. Typical users for radio modems are: land survey differential GPS, fleet management applications, SCADA applications (utility distribution networks), automated meter reading (AMR), telemetry applications and many more. Since applications usually require high reliability of data transfer and very high uptime, radio performance plays a key role. Factors influencing radio performance are: antenna height and type, the sensitivity of the radio, the output power of the radio and the complete system design.

== See also ==
- Flow control (data)
- SATEL
- Racom
