= SATEL =

Finnish radio modem manufacturer

- Industry: Telecommunications; Automation; SCADA; Land Surveying; Real Time Kinematic; Intelligent Transportation Systems; Telemetry
- Founded: Salo, Finland (1986)
- Headquarters: Salo, Finland
- Area served: Worldwide
- Products: Radio modems
- Website: satel.com

SATEL is a Finnish radio modem manufacturer that specializes in developing independent radio networking technology for various industrial applications i.a. land surveying, SCADA, machine control, intelligent transportation systems, telemetry, environmental monitoring and Industrial Internet.

== About the Company ==
SATEL develops and sells private radio technology. The company was founded in 1986. SATEL’s first product was a wrist alarm, shortly followed by production of the first radio modem.

Both SATEL's product development and factory are located in Finland. The distribution network of SATEL covers over 100 countries. Approx. 90% of sales is exported.

== Products ==
=== Serial and TCP/IP communication ===
The SATEL radio modem family offers transparent serial data communication (RS-232, RS-485, RS-422). These products are used in applications ranging from Mt Everest to power distribution networks and from professional motor sports to runway telemetry at airports. Lightweight SATEL-TR4+ / SATEL-TR49 modules are designed to be integrated into a host device, for instance for transfer of GNSS correction data in a land surveying rover or real-time kinematic (RTK) base station.

The SATEL XPRS IP radio router family, which was introduced in November 2008, broadened the offering to TCP/IP based applications. It is based on a Linux operating systems and enables customer specific applications.
