= Cat (disambiguation) =

The cat (Felis catus) is a domesticated feline species.

Cat or CAT may also refer to:

== Arts and entertainment ==
=== Comics ===
- Cat (comics), a list of several characters
- Confidential Assassination Troop, a manhua by Fung Chin Pang from 2003

=== Film and television ===
- Cat, the title character of the 1965 film Cat Ballou
- Cat (Red Dwarf), a character in the sci-fi sitcom
- Cat, a character in the animated television series CatDog
- Cat MacKenzie, a character in Family Affairs
- Cat Valentine (Victorious), a character in Victorious and Sam & Cat
- Cat (TV series), Indian crime thriller streaming television series
- Cat, from Peg + Cat

=== Literature ===
- The Fox and the Cat, a pair of fictional characters from the Italian novel The Adventures of Pinocchio (1881–1883) by Carlo Collodi and several adaptations of the story in other media

=== Music ===
- Cat #1 (album), 1994, by Peter Criss
- "Cat", a track on the 2011 album Minecraft – Volume Alpha by C418
- "Cat", a song on the 2012 album Une Année by Apink
- "Cat", a song on the 2016 album Air for Free by Relient K

=== Video games ===
- C.A.T.: Cyber Attack Team, 2003

== Businesses and organisations ==
=== United States ===
- Caterpillar Inc. (simply known as CAT), a manufacturer of construction and mining equipment
- Secret Service Counter Assault Team

=== United Kingdom ===
- Cambridge Antibody Technology, a biotechnology company
- Centre for Alternative Technology, a charity and eco-centre in Wales
- Competition Appeal Tribunal, a public body

=== Other businesses and organisations ===
- CAT Telecom, a telecoms operator in Thailand
- Committee Against Torture, a UN treaty body
- Crew Against Torture (Russia), a Russian non-governmental organisation

== Education ==
- Common Admission Test, in India
- Cognitive Abilities Test (CogAT), in the US
- Computerized adaptive testing, a method for administering tests

== Linguistics ==
- Catalan language (ISO 639-2 and -3 code: cat)
- Central Atlas Tamazight, a language in North Africa
- Communication accommodation theory, in sociolinguistics

== Science and technology ==
=== Biology and medicine ===
==== Animals ====
- Felidae (the cats or felids), a family of Carnivorans
  - Pantherinae (big cats), a subfamily
  - Felinae (small cats), the other subfamily

==== Biochemistry ====
- CAT, the gene for Catalase
- Chloramphenicol acetyltransferase, an enzyme and antibiotic resistance gene
- Methcathinone or cat, a drug

==== Other uses in biology and medicine ====
- Calibrated automated thrombogram, a coagulation test
- CAT scan or CT scan, a medical imaging X-ray technology
- Combat application tourniquet, a tourniquet developed for use in field combat situations
- Conidial anastomosis tubes, a specialised hyphae emerging from some asexual fungal spores
- Cognitive analytic therapy, a psychological therapy

=== Computing ===
- Cat, categories of twisted pair network cabling
- CAT (phototypesetter) (Computer Assisted Typesetter), a 1972 phototypesetter
- cat (Unix), a Unix utility that concatenates and lists files
- Cat, a clone of the Apple II home computer
- Canon Cat, a desktop computer
- Computer-assisted translation or computer-aided translation
- Computer aided transceiver
- Novation CAT, a modem series
- .cat, a top-level domain for Catalan language and culture

=== Mathematics ===
- Cat, the category of small categories in category theory
- CAT(k) space, a type of metric space

=== Physics ===
- Catadioptric system, in optics
- Cherenkov Array at Themis, an atmospheric Cherenkov imaging telescope
- Cosmic Anisotropy Telescope, a former telescope near Cambridge, UK

=== Other technology ===
- Catalyst (cat.), in chemistry
  - Catalytic converter, an exhaust device

== People ==
- Cat (nickname), a list of people with the nickname
- Cat Glover (born 1968), American choreographer, dancer and singer
- Cat Power (born 1972), American singer-songwriter (real name: Charlyn Marshall)
- Cat Rambo (born 1963), American writer and editor
- Cat Stevens (born 1948), British singer-songwriter (real name: Yusuf Islam)

== Places ==
- Çat, a town and district in Erzurum Province, Turkey
- Çat Dam, on the Abdülharap River in Adıyaman Province, Turkey
- Kingdom of Cat, an early-Mediaeval Pictish kingdom in what is now Scotland
- Cat Cays, a pair of reef islands in the Bahamas
- Cat Island (disambiguation)

== Transportation ==
=== American bus transit systems ===
- Camarillo Area Transit, Camarillo, California
- Canby Area Transit, Oregon
- Capital Area Transit (Harrisburg), Pennsylvania
- Capital Area Transit (Raleigh), North Carolina
- Charlottesville Area Transit, Virginia
- Chatham Area Transit, Georgia
- Clemson Area Transit, South Carolina
- Collier Area Transit, Florida
- Cities Area Transit, North Dakota

=== Aviation ===
- Civil Air Transport (CAT, former ICAO code: CAT), a former Chinese airline, in later years owned by the CIA
- Compagnie Air Transport, a defunct airline of France
- Clear-air turbulence

=== Other transportation ===
- Caterham railway station (station code: CAT), Surrey, England
- Center for Appropriate Transport, a community center for bicycles in Eugene, Oregon, US
- City Airport Train, Vienna, Austria
- Cat, an early collier ship type
- Perth Central Area Transit
- Catamaran, a boat with two hulls

== Other uses ==
- Talleres de Córdoba or Club Atlético Talleres, a sport club from Córdoba, Argentina
- Cat (zodiac), a Vietnamese/Gurung zodiac sign
- Canadian Army Trophy, a tank gunnery competition
- Central Africa Time, a time zone
- Certified Accounting Technician
- Coital alignment technique, a sexual position
- Community asset transfer, a UK legal process
- Cat o' nine tails or cat, a flogging instrument
- A draw, in a game of tic-tac-toe

== See also ==
- List of individual cats
- The Cat (disambiguation)
- Cats (disambiguation)
- Catt (disambiguation)
- Kat (disambiguation)
- Qat (disambiguation)
