= Voice modem =

A voice modem is an analog telephone data modem with a built-in capability of transmitting and receiving voice recordings over the phone line. Voice modems are used for telephony and answering machine applications. Similar to the Hayes command set used for data modems, in which the host PC commands the modem via a series of commands known as AT commands, there exists a well-defined set of common voice AT commands that are somewhat consistent throughout the industry.

== Plus versus Hash ==
Each voice modem platform tends to support either one of two sets of voice commands—in particular, one flavor of the command set contains a plus (+) sign, and the other contains a hash (#) sign.

== Detecting voice mode ==
Support for voice mode can be detected on a modem by issuing the following command: AT+FCLASS=?

This command is usually supported containing the plus sign whether a modem supports "plus" or the "hash" command set, because the command (which stands for "fax class") is part of the industry-standard fax commands which always use the plus.

A modem supporting voice will respond with a comma-delimited list of numbers that includes the number 8. A modem not supporting voice will respond with ERROR, or with a list of numbers not including 8. (Many modems will report 0,1,2 indicating support for data (0), and class 1 and 2 faxes—this is an indication that voice support is not present.)

Modems supporting the "hash" command set usually respond to AT#CLS=? as well.

== Entering voice mode ==
The command AT+FCLASS=8 or AT#CLS=8 will put the modem in voice mode. Most modems still remain on-hook and respond with OK. Once this command has been accepted, most modems will respond with Data Link Escape (DLE) messages instead of or in addition to normal modem responses. For example, instead of reporting a phone line ringing with the RING message, many modems will instead send the DLE ASCII character, followed by the letter R. The specific set of DLE events reported by each modem is specific to its chipset and documented in its reference guide.

== Querying the modem's capabilities ==
The command AT+VLS=? or AT#VLS=? usually returns a list of operating modes that are specific to each modem. Each of these numbered modes determines the telephone line's on-hook or off-hook status, as well as sound routing between each of the following:

- Recording/playback
- Telephone handset
- Speakerphone jack (which could simply be hard-wired as an audio input on the PC's sound card instead of being a discrete jack)
- Microphone jack (available on some voice modems)

Many chipsets offer a listing of all the possible combinations of modes even if the specific modem board doesn't support them all. That's because the board manufacturer is almost always different from the chipset maker, and the chipset comes pre-configured to support all possible hardware, even if not implemented on the circuit board.

Example of response to AT+VLS=? from a modem on the market in 2006:

AT+VLS=?
 0,"",0000000000,0000000000,B084008000
 1,"T",0B8418E000,0FE418E000,0B8419E000
 2,"L",0884008000,0CE4008000,0884018000
 3,"LT",0B8418E000,0FE418E000,0B8419E000
 4,"S",0084008000,0484008000,3084018000
 5,"ST",0B8418E000,0FE418E000,0B8419E000
 6,"M",0084008000,04E4008000,3084008000
 7,"MST",0B8418E000,0FE418E000,0B8419E000
 8,"S1",0084008000,0484008000,3084018000
 9,"S1T",0B8418E000,0FE418E000,0B8419E000
 10,"MS1T",0B8418E000,0FE418E000,0B8419E000
 11,"M1",0084008000,04E4008000,3084008000
 13,"M1S1T",0B8418E000,0FE418E000,0B8419E000
 14,"H",0084008000,04E4008000,3084018000
 15,"HT",0B8418E000,0FE418E000,0B8419E000
 16,"MS",0084008000,04E4008000,3084018000
 17,"MS1",0084008000,04E4008000,3084018000
 19,"M1S1",0084008000,04E4008000,3084018000
 20,"t",0B8418E000,0FE418E000,BB8419E000

While every modem is different, usually mode 0 means on-hook (hung up) and mode 1 is sufficient to pick up the phone, record/playback audio, and detect DTMF (touch tones).

The command AT+VSM=? or AT#VSM=? usually returns a list of audio data formats supported by the modem. Each format includes a name (such as PCM, ADPCM, μ-law, A-law), a number of bits per sample (usually 2, 3, 4, 8, or 16) and an audio sampling rate (usually 7,200, 8,000, or 11,025 Hertz). These are industry-standard audio codecs whose implementations are well published. The ADPCM standard is an exception. Modems claiming to support ADPCM almost always support Dialogic ADPCM, also known as "VOX", which is similar but not compatible with other ADPCM implementations, including Interactive Multimedia Association (IMA) ADPCM as well as MS ADPCM (a Microsoft implementation used in WAV files). Modems may support these as well, if a qualifier is listed—otherwise, by default, ADPCM means Dialogic.

Example response to AT+VSM=? from a modem on the market in 2006:

AT+VSM=?
 1,"UNSIGNED PCM",8,0,8000,0,0
 129,"IMA ADPCM",4,0,8000,0,0
 130,"UNSIGNED PCM",8,0,8000,0,0
 140,"2 Bit ADPCM",2,0,8000,
 141,"4 Bit ADPCM",4,0,8000,0,0

The desired audio data format is selected using the same command but with a number instead of a question mark. It is used for both sending and receiving.

== Answering calls ==
Answering calls is usually done with either the AT+VLS=n or AT#VLS=n commands, where n is a number representing the modem's mode. For the vast majority of modems, this number will be 1 to answer a telephone call, and 0 to hang up; other numbers activate other functionality when present, such as speakerphone. Some modems answer in response to ATA—the standard data-mode answer command—but other modems will interpret this as a command to actually answer in data and not voice mode.

== Transmitting audio data ==
To begin transmitting audio data, the host sends the command AT+VTX or AT#VTX. This results in a response from the modem of CONNECT or VCON. (Modems using the "plus" command set usually respond CONNECT, while those using the "hash" set respond VCON, which stands for voice connect.)

From then on, the modem interprets any data sent from the computer as wave audio data, using the codec selected by the AT+VSM or AT#VSM command.

The audio data is always sent to the modem slightly faster than it can play it, so the modem may buffer a small portion of it and play it smoothly with no clicks or pops caused by delays in the computer's operating system. For example, during playback of an 8 kHz audio file at 8-bit resolution (which creates 8,000 bytes, or 80,000 bits when including start/stop bits, per second), the data must travel over the serial port at a minimum of 115,200 bits per second. (115,200 bit/s is the first setting of a typical computer serial port that's greater than 80,000.) In addition, due to some extra overhead involved in doubling DLE bytes in the stream (mentioned below), a small amount of extra bandwidth is mandatory to allow for this.

When the modem wants the computer to temporarily pause so the playback can catch up, it temporarily lowers the CTS (Clear to Send) signal on the RS-232 serial port. The modem re-raises the signal in time for the computer to resume sending audio data before the playback buffer becomes completely empty.

When the computer wants to signal the end of audio data, most modems expect to see an ASCII DLE character (0x10), followed by the ! character.

Because the DLE byte can and often does occur in normal audio data, it must be sent twice to the modem when it is to be interpreted as a byte of audio data.

Most modems also accept a sequence of DLE + CAN (cancel) as a signal to cancel audio playback. The distinction is that the modem is to understand that it is to immediately abort playback now, rather than let remaining data in the playback buffer run to completion.

When the modem is done playback, it responds OK.

=== Throttling playback ===
During playback, it is necessary to send the audio data at a rate that keeps the audio playing smoothly, but without sending it faster than the modem can handle it. It is also desirable to make sure the modem can always abort playback and discard any buffered audio in case a message is to be canceled. Message cancellation is expected by callers who already know the answers to voice prompts and provide their answer early (and who would become irritated at being forced to listen to a prompt they've already responded to).

There are several ways to keep the computer sending audio data to the modem at a rate to keep up with playback without overrunning the audio buffer.

The most straightforward is to use CTS flow control. The following caveats exist.

- Some voice modems have bugs in their implementation of flow control. In particular, a large number of Conexant chipsets will sometimes drop their CTS line and never bring it back up during playback. Conexant is a hugely popular chipset in voice modems today and they otherwise implement voice commands well, making it worthwhile to consider working around this bug. Some Conexant chipsets will also not bring CTS back up if the "playback abort" command is sent or processed by the modem while CTS is down.
- Some voice modems offer a very large transmit buffer (for example, 4 seconds' worth of audio) coupled with a bug that prevents the host from requesting an "abort playback". The result is that if a caller presses a touch-tone that's supposed to interrupt a message, and the host is providing unlimited audio data mediated by CTS alone, the end result is that the message can't be interrupted for at least 4 seconds.

A second way to throttle playback involves polling a "tick" timer provided by the host computer's operating system and based on a hardware clock that's independent of the host's CPU load. This may or may not be available, and it depends entirely on the host operating system. However, when available, it is extremely reliable. It is reasonable to assume that the PC needs to stay ahead of the playback by a couple of hundred bytes and that the modem will buffer this. (The commands AT+VBQ or AT#VBQ on voice modems will often reveal the size of the buffer in bytes, and 1 to 2 kilobytes is a typical response.)

A third way to throttle playback involves inserting dummy DLE messages into the output stream such that the audio data takes a known amount of time to transmit through the serial port, and the playback is essentially clocked by the UART in the serial port.

For example, when considering using dummy DLE stuffing, a few things must first be noted. In a typical scenario, one second of audio might be 8,000 one-byte samples, and with a small percentage of the samples being equal to the DLE byte and must be doubled, a typical second of audio might be 8,050 bytes. The trick involves inserting enough meaningless DLE messages into the bytes that the modem will discard (that is, a DLE followed by a byte without any specific meaning) so that there are exactly 11,520 bytes (assuming a serial port locked at 115,200 bit/s) which will take exactly 1 second to transmit through the serial port. Although it is possible that interrupt latency on the host PC may cause slightly less than 11,520 bytes to be sent per second, most voice modems will buffer enough bytes before actually starting playback to permit a small skew here. Also the PC can be programmed to convert a second of audio into slightly fewer than 11,520 bytes (all voice modems will buffer a small overrun without the need for flow control as long as it is no more than a few hundred bytes).

Dummy DLE stuffing is unlikely to work with "Winmodems" that have no physical UART. It makes sense only with external serial modems that are physically clocked to a specific bit rate by a clock generator behind the external serial port.

== Recording audio data ==
The method for recording audio data is the same, except that the command is AT+VRX, or AT#VRX, and the modem transmits audio data while the computer receives it. The RTS/CTS flow control are not used here (the computer must accept all the audio data it receives, and the modem automatically paces its transmission to match the audio sampling rate).

The modem never stops transmitting until the computer tells it to stop, which is usually with CTRL-C. The data is always terminated with DLE+!, and all DLE bytes naturally occurring in the stream are sent twice to differentiate them from normal DLE messages.

Before, during, and after recording, the modem may notify the computer host of specific events including, but not limited to, the following:

- Touch-tone keypresses detected
- Silence detected
- Line polarity reversal detected (often meaning caller hang-up)
- Dial tone detected
- Fax tone detected

When the modem wants to tell the host about these, it sends a DLE byte, plus a (usually) 1-byte message describing the event. The list of supported events varies by modem, but usually a digit (as well as * and #) mean touch-tones pressed, and the letter "s" means silence detected. Some modems report only one event for each touch-tone keypress, while others report a keypress repeatedly until the key is released, and then a special "key released" event.

== Terminating a voice call ==
Any of the following commands usually cause the modem to hang up and terminate a voice call: AT+VLS=0, AT#VLS=0, ATH, ATZ. Dropping the RS-232 DTR (data terminal ready) signal often accomplishes this as well. The modem remains in voice mode (except in the case of ATZ).

Voice modems do not automatically hang up even when the caller on the other end does. They may report the hangup, dialtone, or silence events, but it is up to the computer to act upon them. If when the modem is recording, the caller hangs up and the computer doesn't react, the modem will continue providing the audio recording everything else heard on the line, such as dial tones, telephone company error messages, and so forth.

== See also ==
- Hayes command set
- List of ITU-T V-series recommendations
- Telephony
