= Ooru Peru Bhairavakona =

2024 Indian fantasy thriller film

Bhairavakona
- Theatrical release poster
- Directed by: Vi Anand
- Screenplay by: Vi Anand
- Dialogues by: Nandu Savirigana; Bhanu Bogavarapu
- Story by: Bhanu Bogavarapu
- Produced by: Razesh Danda
- Starring: Sundeep Kishan; Varsha Bollamma; Kavya Thapar; Brahmaji; Vennela Kishore; Harsha Chemudu
- Cinematography: Raj Thota
- Edited by: Chota K. Prasad
- Music by: Shekar Chandra
- Production companies: AK Entertainments; Hasya Movies
- Release date: 16 February 2024
- Running time: 136 minutes
- Country: India
- Language: Telugu
- Box office: ₹20 crore

Ooru Peru Bhairavakona (transl. Village name is Bhairavakona) is a 2024 Indian Telugu-language supernatural romantic thriller film directed by Vi Anand, from a story written by Bhanu Bogavarapu. It was produced by Razesh Danda and co-produced by Balaji Gutta, under Hasya Movies, and presented by Anil Sunkara, under AK Entertainments. It features Sundeep Kishan, Varsha Bollamma, Kavya Thapar, Brahmaji, Vennela Kishore and Harsha Chemudu. It was a commercial success, grossing over ₹20 crore at the box office.

== Plot ==
Basava works as a stunt double in films. As he is in dire need of money, he steals the bride's jewelry from a marriage. Basava is accompanied by his friend John. While trying to escape from the Police, Basava and John see Agraharam Geetha, who has met with an accident. They decide to help Geetha and take her along in their car. Basava, John, and Geetha reach a mysterious place named Bhairavakona. There they meet Dr. Narappa for Geetha's treatment in Bhairavakona, where they experience strange things. What are they? What made Basava steal jewellery? Who is Bhoomi, and how is she related to Basava? What is the enigma behind Bhairavakona? This forms the crux of the story.

== Cast ==
- Sundeep Kishan as Basavalingam "Basava"
- Varsha Bollamma as Bhoomi
- Kavya Thapar as Agraharam Geetha
- Brahmaji as Inspector S. Ranga Rao
- Vennela Kishore as Dr. Narappa, Rajappa's father and Katyayini's grandfather
- Harsha Chemudu as John, Basava's friend
- Danda Shanvi
- Vadivukkarasi as Pedamma
- P. Ravi Shankar as Rajappa, Katyayini's father; Narappa's son
- Jayaprakash as Murali, Katyayini's adoptive father
- Billy Murali as Priest
- Chammak Chandra
- Ramesh Reddy
- Mime Gopi as Shankar, an international criminal
- Manik Reddy as Basava's Uncle, who also killed Shankar
- Ravi Varma
- Duvvasi Mohan as Police constable Rao
- Sarayu
- Rajasekhar Aningi as a forest officer
- Mime Madhu as a forest officer
- Sri Satya as Katyayini

== Production ==
The film was launched with a Muhurtham pooja on 19 September 2021 in Hyderabad.

On 7 May 2022, the creators of the film unveiled the initial glimpse and title on Sundeep Kishan's birthday. Subsequently, on 23 June 2023, the Principal photography for the film wrapped up, marking the end of the production phase.

== Soundtrack ==
The soundtrack and film score of the film were composed by Shekar Chandra. The music rights of the film were acquired by Aditya Music. The first track from the album, "Nijame Ne Chebutunna", was released on 31 March 2023. This was followed by the second track, "Humma Humma", on 27 December 2023. The third track, "Haromhara", was released on 11 February 2024. The remaining singles, "Kill The Devil" and "Idi Bhairavakona" were released as part of a jukebox on 15 February 2024.

No.	Title	Lyrics	Singer(s)	Length
1.	"Nijame Ne Chebutunna"	Sri Mani	Sid Sriram	3:34
2.	"Humma Humma"	Shekar Chandra, Tirupathi Jaavana	Ram Miriyala	3:09
3.	"Haromhara"	Chaitu Satsangi	Chaitu Satsangi	2:27
4.	"Kill The Devil"	Nikesh Kumar Dasagrandhi	Shekar Chandra, Dinesh Rudra, Rithesh G Rao	2:05
5.	"Idi Bairavakona"	Chaitu Satsangi	Chaitu Satsangi	1:46

== Release ==
Ooru Peru Bhairavakona, initially scheduled for release on 9 February 2024, was postponed to 16 February 2024. However, premiere shows were available from 14 February 2024. The decision to reschedule the release was attributed to the preference for a solo release of Eagle.

The film premiered on Amazon Prime Video on 8 March 2024.

== Reception ==
The Hindu stated that "Ooru Peru Bhairavakona has interesting ideas that do not translate into an engrossing fantasy drama". Neeshita Nyayapati of Hindustan Times opined that "Ooru Peru Bhairavakona is a popcorn watch that is not as complex as it feels initially. It helps that the lead cast perform their roles well, ably aided by Raj Thota's cinematography".
