= Vi Anand =

Indian film director and screenwriter

- Born: 20 February 1979 (age 47); Erode, Tamil Nadu, India
- Education: Sathyabama Institute of Science and Technology
- Occupations: Film director, screenwriter
- Years active: 2014–present

Vi Anand is an Indian film director and screenwriter who primarily works in Telugu cinema. He is known for directing science fiction films.

== Early life ==
Anand was born in Erode, Tamil Nadu on 20 February 1979. He graduated from Sathyabama Institute of Science and Technology. Before becoming a filmmaker, he was an architect.

== Career ==
In 2006, Anand started as assistant director to director A. R. Murugadoss on Stalin (2006). Before this, he worked under Prathap Pothan for 3 1/2 years as an advertising assistant.

Anand made his directorial debut with Hrudayam Ekkadunnadi in 2014. The film was named after a song from Ghajini (2005), which was directed by Murugadoss. In the same year, he made his directorial debut in Tamil cinema with a science fiction drama, Appuchi Gramam.

In 2015, Anand directed the Telugu action film Tiger starring Sundeep Kishan, Rahul Ravindran and Seerat Kapoor. The film was very well received by critics, and Anand was noted for the screenwriting of the film. In 2016, Anand went on to write and direct a supernatural romantic thriller Ekkadiki Pothavu Chinnavada, which featured Nikhil Siddharth, Hebah Patel, Nandita Swetha and Avika Gor in the lead roles. The film received positive reviews and became a blockbuster.

In 2017, Anand directed Okka Kshanam, a science fiction drama starring Allu Sirish, Seerat Kapoor, and Surbhi. The film deals with a parallel life concept where the protagonist fights against his own destiny, fate and time. The film released worldwide on 28 December 2017 to mixed reviews from critics and audience.

2020 saw Anand directing Disco Raja, a science fiction film starring Ravi Teja in the lead role. The film received mixed reviews but became a box office bomb. In 2024, he directed Ooru Peru Bhairavakona.

== Filmography ==
- Note: all films are in Telugu, unless otherwise noted.

Key
†	Denotes films that have not yet been released

Year	Title	Notes
2014	Hrudayam Ekkadunnadi	
2014	Appuchi Gramam	Tamil film
2015	Tiger	
2016	Ekkadiki Pothavu Chinnavada	
2017	Okka Kshanam	
2020	Disco Raja	
2024	Ooru Peru Bhairavakona	
