= Disco Raja =

2020 film by Vi Anand

- Theatrical release poster
- Directed by: Vi Anand
- Screenplay by: Vi Anand
- Dialogues by: Abburi Ravi
- Story by: Vi Anand
- Produced by: Ram Talluri
- Starring: Ravi Teja; Bobby Simha; Payal Rajput; Nabha Natesh; Tanya Hope; Mahaboob Basha
- Cinematography: Karthik Gattamneni
- Edited by: Shravan Katikaneni
- Music by: S. Thaman
- Production company: SRT Entertainments
- Distributed by: T-Series Films
- Release date: 24 January 2020
- Running time: 149 minutes
- Country: India
- Language: Telugu
- Budget: ₹30 crore

Disco Raja is a 2020 Indian Telugu-language science fiction action thriller film directed by Vi Anand and produced by Ram Talluri under SRT Entertainment's banner. It stars Ravi Teja in a dual role along with Bobby Simha, Payal Rajput, Nabha Natesh, Tanya Hope, Sunil, and Vennela Kishore. The music is composed by S. Thaman with cinematography by Karthik Ghattamaneni and editing by Shravan Katikaneni. In the film, a new scientific discovery is used by a group of scientists to regenerate a murdered music-loving don by using the don's son as a subject.

Disco Raja was released theatrically on 24 January 2020, and received mixed reviews from critics, who praised Ravi Teja's performance, action sequences, soundtrack and background score, but the film became a box-office bomb. Subsequently, the plans for a sequel were canceled.

== Plot ==
A brutally attacked man left for dead in the mountain ranges of Ladakh, is found frozen by an expedition team. He is taken to the "Re-Live lab", where Dr. Shishir introduces a technology that can revive dead people to Dr. Parineeti and her colleague Phalguni. Following the experiment, the subject wakes up but with no memory of his past. In Delhi, the subject's girlfriend Nabha explains to a loan officer that the subject named Vasu, handled multiple professions from day to night, during which she fell for him. While searching for his stepbrother Kaushik, who snatched the family's money, Vasu found him, but never returned. She also reveals that Vasu's family members are actually orphans who came to live together.

Meanwhile, Vasu escapes using Parineeti's card, but is recaptured after he faints due to being exposed to heavy lighting. Parineeti explains that Vasu was killed by someone and revived by the doctors, but is adamant about making Vasu revive his memories, and retrieves a commodity found with his corpse, giving it to Phalguni for servicing. In an attempt to gain the attention of those who remember him, Vasu thrashes a minister, and the video goes viral following his arrest. An aged gangster named Burma Sethu is surprised to find Vasu alive and sends his men to pick him from the police station with the help of Laalu Sastry's group. The goons take away Vasu, his brother and the doctors.

However, Phalguni throws out Vasu's package given by Parineeti, and Vasu picks up the package to find walkman player and headphones. Listening to the music, Vasu's memories are revived, and fights off the henchmen, revealing himself to be Disco Raj; this information also reaches to Sethu by Laalu Sastry. Shishir explains that Raj's actual age is 70 as he was frozen for 35 years, and is possibly not Vasu. Raj takes Phalguni along with him on a quest to rediscover his identity. In the hospital, an injured Shishir explains to Sethu about Raj's revival. Raj visits the Madras Bar founded by him, where a friend explains that Raj was a music-loving gangster, who is at loggerheads with Sethu, a rival gangster whose refusal to collaborate sparked a gang war.

Both parties killed each other's members, but Raj succeeded in getting Sethu arrested for life. Raj also fell for a deaf and mute girl named Helen, who initially declined, but eventually reciprocated his feelings. When Helen got pregnant before marriage, Raj married her, faked his own death and left behind his gang to start a new life. However, Sethu was freed from prison and vengefully killed Raj's gang members. Raj and Helen were also attacked in Ladakh, but Raj managed to send Helen away in a truck before himself getting killed. After the revelation, Raj is confronted by Vasu and reveals himself as his son. Arriving at the spot, Raj and Phalguni are attacked by Vasu, who questions Raj about killing Helen. Raj denies killing her and gets into a fight with Sethu.

A stabbed Sethu reveals he did not get Raj killed in Ladakh, and he came after him to avenge his wife's murder. Raj denies killing her where he realizes the truth, and shoots the cop, who had not just brainwashed Vasu, but also sent goons to kill Vasu's family. Seeing the photo of the officer's corpse, the goons retreat. Raj and Phalguni discover that a man named Anthony Das gave orders to kill them, and along with Vasu, hold Anthony's men on gunpoint, before Anthony, revealed to be Raj's gang member Uttar Kumar, shoots Raj. He reveals that he killed Sethu's wife and got the latter to kill Raj's gang. Anthony even faked his own death and was one of the men who stabbed Raj in Ladakh.

However, Raj, Vasu and Phalguni together fight off and finish the goons. Raj later kills Anthony, and himself succumbs to the injuries. Returning to Delhi, Vasu pays his family's loan with the help of Kaushik and reconciles with Nabha. In the lab, Raj is brought back to life once again by the doctors, while Sethu and Anthony are also recovering in the lab.

== Cast ==
- Ravi Teja in a dual roles
  - Disco Raj: Helen's Husband & Vasu's father
  - Vasu: Disco Raj and Helen's son, Nabha's boyfriend
- Bobby Simha as Burma Sethu, Raj's former rival
- Nabha Natesh as Nabha, Vasu's girlfriend
- Payal Rajput as Helen, a deaf and mute girl, Raj's wife and Vasu's mother
- Tanya Hope as Dr. Parineeti
- Sunil as Utham Kumar / Anthony Das, Raj's gang member; Later Enemy
- Vennela Kishore as Phalguni, Parineeti's colleague who has a crush on her
- Ramki as Bharani
- Naresh as Kukuteshwar Rao
- Shishir Sharma as Dr. Shishir, founder of Re-Live Labs
- Satya as Philip
- Giri Babu as Rama Chandra Murthy
- Chandra Mohan as Chandram
- Raghu Babu as Raghu
- Satyam Rajesh as Bogi
- Annapurna as Deaf and mute News Reader/Translator between Raj and Helen
- Bharath Reddy as Subbu
- C. V. L. Narasimha Rao as Kaushik's father
- Abhay Bethiganti as Sethu's assistant
- Muskan Arora
- Shankar Melkote as Melkote
- Siddharth Gollapudi as Scientist

== Music ==
Disco Raja

Soundtrack album by S. Thaman
- Released: 2020
- Recorded: 2019
- Venue: AM studios
- Studio: Chennai
- Genre: Feature film soundtrack
- Labels: Lahari Music, T-Series
- Producer: S. Thaman

S. Thaman chronology
| Ala Vaikunthapurramuloo (2020) | Disco Raja (2020) | Miss India (2020) |
External audio
- Official Audio Jukebox on YouTube

Singles from Disco Raja
- 1. "Nuvvu Naatho Emannavo" Released: 19 October 2019; 2. "Dilli Wala" Released: 20 December 2019; 3. "Rum Pum Bum" Released: 16 January 2020; 4. "Freak Out" Released: 21 January 2020

Music was composed by S. Thaman, collaborating with Ravi Teja for the eleventh time and with Vi Anand for the second time after Tiger.

The first single track titled "Nuvvu Naatho Emannavo" was released on 19 October 2019. The melody was sung by S. P. Balasubrahmanyam and lyrics penned by Sirivennela Seetharama Sastry.

The second single track, "Dilli Wala", was released on 20 December 2019; the peppy number was sung by Aditya Iyengar, Geetha Madhuri, Rahul Nambiar and lyrics penned by Ramajogayya Sastry. Thaman has given an EDM touch to it with his contemporary score.

Track list
| No. | Title | Lyrics | Singer(s) | Length |
|---|---|---|---|---|
| 1. | "Nuvvu Naatho Emannavo" | Sirivennela Seetharama Sastry | S. P. Balasubrahmanyam | 5:40 |
| 2. | "Dilli Wala" | Ramajogayya Sastry | Aditya Iyengar, Geetha Madhuri, Rahul Nambiar | 5:11 |
| 3. | "Rum Pum Bum" | Sirivennela Seetharama Sastry | Ravi Teja, Bappi Lahiri, Sri Krishna | 3:26 |
| 4. | "Freak Out (Theme Music)" | | Instrumental | 2:15 |
| Total length: | | | | 15:22 |

== Marketing ==
The film's motion poster was released on Teja's birthday and Republic Day 26 January 2019. The first look poster of Bobby Simha was released on 6 November 2019, on his birthday and revealed his character as Burma Sethu. On 4 December 2019 movie has announced the teaser trailer release date by releasing a new poster featuring Teja. First look poster of Payal Rajput was released on 5 December 2019, on her birthday. First look poster of Nabha Natesh was released on 11 December 2019, on her birthday. The teaser trailer of the film was released on 6 December 2019. The second teaser trailer of the film was released on 13 January 2020. The Pre-release event was held on 19 January 2020 at N convention Madhapur, Hyderabad.

== Reception ==
Manoj Kumar R of The Indian Express gave 2.5/5 stars and wrote, "Disco Raja works because Anand has relied more on his technical team and storytelling skills, instead of solely depending on Ravi Teja’s antics. It was also refreshing to see a director/writer being light on his feet, improvising and experimenting with the narrative structure without following a certain formula." Neeshita Nyayapati of The Times of India gave 2.5/5 stars and wrote, "Disco Raja is a mixed bag that’s let down by Vi Anand’s writing. Despite picking an interesting aspect to base his tale on, he falls down the rabbit hole of delivering ‘entertainment’ in a routine manner." Murali Krishna CH of Cinema Express gave 2.5/5 stars and wrote, "With a run-time of nearly 150-minutes, Disco Raja is a film that hardly entertains. As you leave the theatre, you can't help missing the real sense of fun and thrills that Vi Anand's films delivered in the past." Sangeetha Devi Dundoo of The Hindu wrote, "Generous trimming and some more attention to a few characters could have made this a different film."

== Release ==
The film was released on 24 January 2020.
