= NO CARRIER =

Text message transmitted from a modem

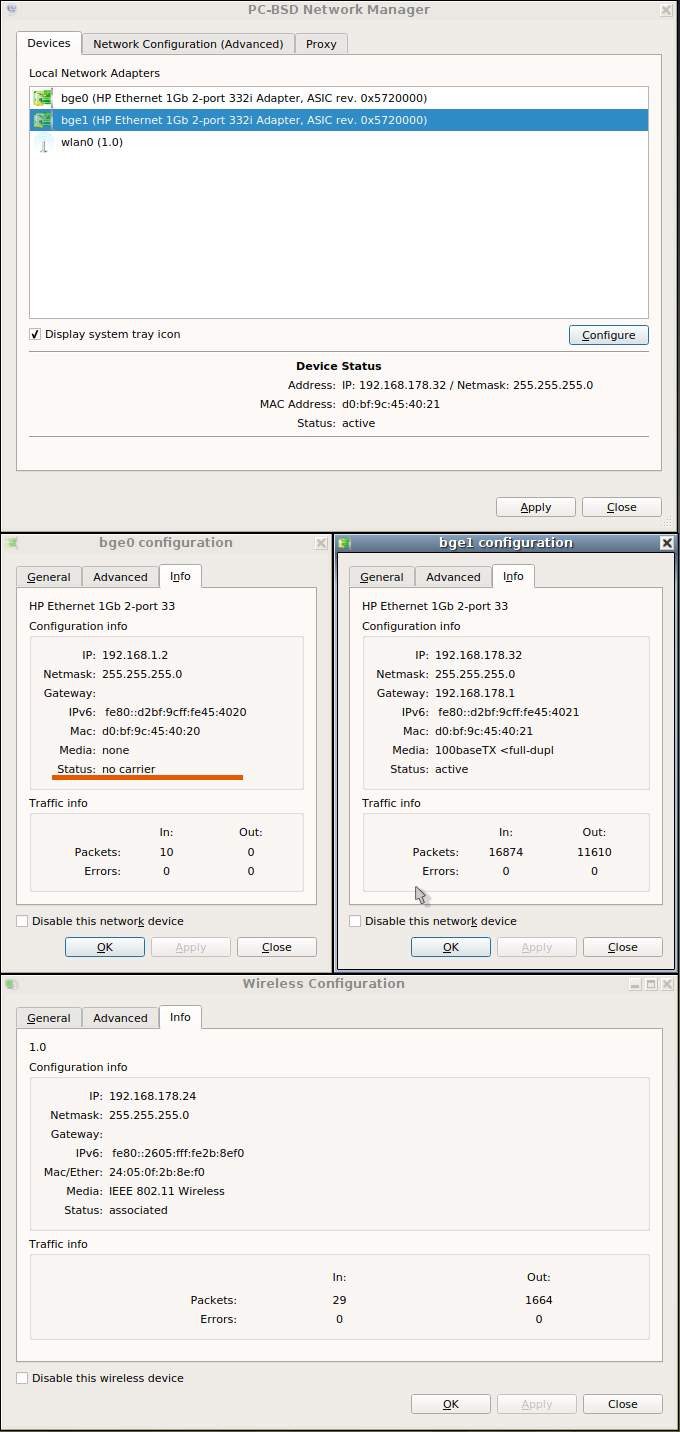
Current use: no carrier status message shown in widgets of a PC-BSD 10.1.2 network manager (running on MATE). Three network interface widgets (2 Ethernet and 1 WiFi) showing two network interfaces being up, one being down with no cable plugged in (hence: "no carrier"), underlined in red.

NO CARRIER (capitalized) is a word code transmitted from a modem to its attached device (typically a computer), indicating the modem is not (or no longer) connected to a remote system.

NO CARRIER is a response message that is defined in the Hayes command set. Due to the popularity of Hayes modems during the heyday of dial-up connectivity, most other modem manufacturers supported the Hayes command set. For this reason, the NO CARRIER message was ubiquitously understood to mean that one was no longer connected to a remote system.

== Carrier tone ==
A carrier tone is an audio carrier signal used by two modems to suppress echo cancellation and establish a baseline frequency for communication. When the answering modem detects a ringtone on the phone line, it picks up that line and starts transmitting a carrier tone. If it does not receive data from the calling modem within a set amount of time, it disconnects the line. The calling modem waits for the tone after it dials the phone line before it initiates data transmission. If it does not receive a carrier tone within a set amount of time, it will disconnect the phone line and issues the NO CARRIER message.

The actual data is transmitted from the answering modem to the calling modem via modulation of the carrier.

== Practical meaning ==
The NO CARRIER message is issued by a modem for any of the following reasons:

- A dial (ATD) or answer (ATA) command did not result in a successful connection to another modem, and the reason wasn't that the line was BUSY (a separately defined message).
- A dial or answer command was aborted while in progress. The abort can be triggered by the computer receiving a keypress to abort or the computer dropping the Data Terminal Ready (DTR) signal to hang up.
- A previously established data connection has ended (either at the attached computer's command, or as a result of being disconnected from the remote end), and the modem has now gone from the data mode to the command mode.

NO CARRIER status message of an Ethernet network interface being up but with no cable plugged in

== Current use ==
As modems have progressed to pack more bits per second over a telephone line, the specific implementation involves modulating on other than the audio-frequency carrier (particularly on digital modems that connect via ISDN or cellular networks), the message NO CARRIER remains consistent for the sake of compatibility.

Linux's network stack uses the NO CARRIER status for a network interface that is turned on ("up") but cannot be connected because the physical layer is not operating properly, e.g. because an Ethernet cable is not plugged in.

== As Internet slang ==
The NO CARRIER message can be used at the end of a sentence for humorous purposes in Internet messages and forum posts, signifying that the person typing the message was suddenly cut off. This joke may mean that the typist was writing something excessively boring or illogical, or something the authorities (usually either the government or the site moderators) would supposedly want to suppress. Alternatively, it may imply they were simply a victim of bad luck. The NO CARRIER message is usually preceded by a string of garbage characters, as a parody of what used to frequently happen to users of dialup BBSes whose telephones suddenly dropped signal in the middle of a message. (Hey! Wait! Don't pick up the ph{#`%${%&`+'${`%&NO CARRIER) This joke anachronistically continues to be seen on the Internet despite the waning use of modems in favor of broadband connectivity.
