= Shyam K. Naidu =

Indian cinematographer

- Born: Andhra Pradesh, India
- Occupation: Cinematographer
- Relatives: Chota K. Naidu (brother); Sundeep Kishan (nephew)
- Awards: Nandi Awards

Shyam. K. Naidu (born: Kamireddy Shyam Naidu) is an Indian cinematographer known for his work in Tollywood. He is known for his collaborations with Puri Jagannadh.

== Filmography ==
Year	Title	Notes
1995	Mister Mayagadu	
1997	Osey Ramulamma	
1997	Rowdy Durbar	
1998	Greekuveerudu	
1999	Raja	
1999	Seenu	
2000	Nuvvu Vasthavani	
2000	Bagunnaraa	
2000	Ninne Premistha	
2000	Aaghaaz	Hindi film
2001	Priyamaina Neeku	
2001	Bava Nachadu	
2001	Snehamante Idera	
2001	Simharasi	
2002	Adrustam	
2002	Idiot	
2002	Siva Rama Raju	
2003	Amma Nanna O Tamila Ammayi	
2003	Sivamani	
2004	Andhrawala	
2004	143	
2004	Mass	
2005	Super	
2006	Pokiri	
2007	Desamuduru	
2007	Chirutha	
2008	Bujjigaadu	
2008	Neninthe	
2009	Ride	
2009	Ek Niranjan	
2010	Golimaar	
2010	Nagavalli	
2011	Rajanna	
2012	Bodyguard	
2012	Businessman	
2012	Devudu Chesina Manushulu	
2012	Julayi	
2012	Cameraman Gangatho Rambabu	
2014	Rabhasa	
2015	Temper	
2016	Abbayitho Ammayi	
2016	Dictator	
2017	Dwaraka	
2017	London Babulu	
2017	Okka Kshanam	
2018	Ee Maaya Peremito	
2021	Narappa	
2021	Ishq	
2022	Super Machi	
2024	Bootcut Balaraju	
2024	Siddharth Roy	
2024	Double iSmart	
2025	Thala	
2025	The 100	

== Awards and nominations ==
2nd South Indian International Movie Awards

- Nominated—Best Cinematographer (Telugu) South Indian International Movie Awards for Business Man
