= Cat (comics) =

Cat, in comics, may refer to:

- Tigra (a.k.a. Greer Grant Nelson), a Marvel Comics character whose original superhero identity was the Cat
- Patsy Walker, a Marvel Comics character who inherited the Cat costume and took the name the Hellcat
- Shen Kuei, a Marvel Comics character who also goes by the name the Cat
- Emma Malone, a Marvel UK character who appeared in titles like Gene Dogs
- Cat (Exiles), an alternative version of Kitty Pryde who appeared in the Exiles
- Cat, a character from Cat & Mouse by Aircel Comics
- Cat Grant, a DC Comics character
- An unnamed, red-headed male cat burglar whom Spider-Man has battled twice (the first time in The Amazing Spider-Man #30 (Nov. 1965))

== See also ==
- Cat (disambiguation)
- Catwoman, a DC Comics character
- Cat-Man, a number of comics characters of the same name
- Black Cat (comics), a Marvel Comics character
- List of fictional cats in comics
