= Big cat (disambiguation) =

A big cat is a cheetah, cougar, jaguar, leopard, lion, snow leopard or tiger.

Big Cat or Big Cats may also refer to:

== Games ==
- Big Cat, a non-standard poker hand

== Music ==
- The Big Cats, an American rock band
- Big Cats (producer), American hip hop producer
- Big Cat Records, a UK record label
- Big Cat Records (U.S. record label)
- "Big Cat", a song from Boy King by Wild Beasts
- "Big Cat", a track from Volume 2: Release by Afro Celt Sound System

== People ==
- Big Cats (producer), American hip hop producer
- Andrei Vasilevskiy ("the Big Cat"), Russian ice hockey goaltender
- Andrés Galarraga, Venezuelan baseball player in the MLB, nicknamed the "Big Cat"
- Ernie Ladd American footballer and professional wrestler known as the Big Cat.
- Curtis Hughes another American professional wrestler, also known as the Big Cat.
- James O. Williams American footballer, also known as "Big Cat".
- Dan Katz (podcaster) (born 1985), American podcaster for Barstool Sports known as "Big Cat"
- Leonard Williams (born 1994), American footballer nicknamed "Big Cat"

== Vehicles ==
- ORA Big Cat, a prototype electric car model
- Big Cat HPV, maker of Catrike tricycles
- Collective nickname for "Panther" or "Tiger" models of German tanks in World War II

== See also ==
- Big the Cat, a character in the Sonic the Hedgehog video games
- The Big Cat (disambiguation)
