= The Cat =

The Cat may refer to:

== Nickname ==
- Mathilde Carré (1910-2007), French spy, double and possibly triple agent
- Peter Bonetti (1941–2020), English footballer
- Greg Cattrano (born 1975), American lacrosse player
- Ernest Miller (born 1964), American professional wrestler
- Félix Potvin (born 1971), Canadian hockey player
- Carl Thompson (boxer) (born 1964), British boxer
- Emile Francis (born 1926), Canadian hockey player, coach, and general manager, most notably of the New York Rangers
- Bogdan Lobonț (born 1978), Romanian football player, now under contract with AS Roma
- Phil Tufnell (born 1966), British television personality and former test cricketer for England
- Tony Meo (born 1959), English snooker player
- Dave Gahan (born 1962), English singer-songwriter
- Oleksandr Usyk (born 1988), Ukrainian boxer
- Russell Westbrook (born 1988), American professional basketball player

== Film ==
- The Cat (1947 film), an Argentine film
- The Cat (1956 film), a French-Spanish film
- The Cat (1966 film), an American film
- The Cat (1971 film), a French film
- The Cat (1977 film), an Italian film
- The Cat (1988 film), a German film
- The Cat (1992 film), a Hong Kong film directed by Lam Ngai Kai
- The Cat (2011 film), a South Korean film

== Television ==
- T.H.E. Cat, a 1966–1967 TV series starring Robert Loggia
- "The Cat/The Black Cat", an episode of Spider-Man: The Animated Series
- The Cat (Red Dwarf), a character in the TV show Red Dwarf

== Comics ==
- The Cat, original title of a Marvel Comics series and character, later renamed Tigra
- The Cat, alternate name for Walter Hardy, a Marvel Comics character
- The Cat, original name for Catwoman, a DC Comics character
- The Cat, alternate name for Shen Kuei, a Marvel Comics character
- The Cat, English name of the title character of the Belgian comic strip Le Chat

== Ferry services ==
- Former name of Hai Xia Hao, ferry formerly operated in the Gulf of Maine
- Bay Ferries Great Lakes, in Lake Ontario
- Former marketing name of the T&T Express

== Other uses ==
- The Cat (album), a 1964 jazz album by Jimmy Smith
- The title character of the book The Cat in the Hat and the movies
- The Cat, a fictional character from the novel Animal Farm
- An informal term for Catawissa Creek
- "The Cat", a guitar model manufactured by Aria
- The Cat (novel), a book by Georges Simemon

== See also ==
- Cat (disambiguation)
- The Cats (disambiguation)
- Catman (disambiguation)
- The Big Cat (disambiguation)
- La Chatte (The She-Cat), a French novel
