= Double iSmart =

2024 Indian film by Puri Jagannadh

- Theatrical release poster
- Directed by: Puri Jagannadh
- Written by: Puri Jagannadh
- Produced by: Puri Jagannadh; Charmy Kaur
- Starring: Ram Pothineni; Sanjay Dutt; Ali; Kavya Thapar
- Cinematography: Shyam K. Naidu; Gianni Giannelli
- Edited by: Karthika Srinivas
- Music by: Mani Sharma
- Production company: Puri Connects
- Distributed by: Primeshow Entertainment; Mythri Movie Makers (Telugu); Sakthi Film Factory (Tamil Nadu)
- Release date: 15 August 2024
- Running time: 162 minutes
- Country: India
- Language: Telugu
- Budget: ₹90 crore
- Box office: est.₹19.40 crore

Double iSmart is a 2024 Indian Telugu-language science fiction action film directed by Puri Jagannadh, who co-produced with Charmy Kaur under Puri Connects. It is the spiritual sequel to iSmart Shankar. The film stars Ram Pothineni, alongside Sanjay Dutt (in his Telugu debut), Ali, Kavya Thapar, Sayaji Shinde and Bani J. The music was composed by Mani Sharma, while cinematography and editing were handled by Gianni Giannelli & Shyam K. Naidu and Karthika Srinivas.

Double iSmart was theatrically released on 15 August 2024, coinciding with Indian Independence Day. The film was panned by critics and eventually became Puri Jagannadh's second consecutive box-office bomb after Liger.

== Plot ==
Big Bull, a notorious assassin, wants to achieve immortality and decides to transfer his memories to "iSmart" Shankar, who already has another's person's memories transferred to him, thus setting the stage for the intense confrontation between Shankar and Big Bull.

== Cast ==
Adapted from the opening credits:

- Ram Pothineni as Ustaad "iSmart" Shankar alias Double ismart Big Bull (memory transfer)
  - Chekiri as young Shankar
- Sanjay Dutt as Big Bull
- Ali as Boka
- Kavya Thapar as Jannat Mehrunnisa, Shankar's love interest
- Sayaji Shinde as CBI Officer Parmeshwaram
- Bani J as Bentley
- Makarand Deshpande as Dr Thomas
- Jhansi as Pochamma, Shankar's mother
  - Pragathi as Old Pochamma
- Temper Vamsi as Addagutta Akbar
- Jairoop Jeevan as Harshvardhan
- Uttej as CI K. Ravi Prakash
- Getup Srinu as Shankar's friend
- Rohini as lady constable
- Ganesh Yadav as police inspector
- Kecha Khamphakdee as Chinese mafia Wong
- Vishal Sharma as security officer
- Puri Jagannadh as himself in the song "SteppaMaar"

== Production ==
Double iSmart was officially announced on 14 May 2023 by Ram Pothineni and Puri Jagannadh. Sanjay Dutt joined the cast as the main antagonist, making his debut in Telugu cinema.

Principal photography commenced on 12 July 2023, after a grand launch in Hyderabad. The first schedule wrapped on 31 July 2023, featuring an action sequence filmed in Mumbai. The second schedule commenced in Thailand in August 2023. Some sequences of the film were shot in Mumbai in May 2024, following which the production faced delays due to financial constraints though later resolved. The climax of the film was shot in Mumbai, where a large set worth ₹8 crore was made. The principal photography was wrapped on 5 July.

== Soundtrack ==
Double iSmart

Soundtrack album by Mani Sharma
- Released: 20 August 2024
- Recorded: 2023–24
- Genre: Feature film soundtrack
- Length: 20:02
- Language: Telugu
- Label: Aditya Music

Official audio
- Audio Jukebox on YouTube

The soundtrack album and background score for the film were composed by Mani Sharma. The audio rights were acquired by Aditya Music.

The first single titled "SteppaMaar" was released on 1 July 2024. The second single titled "Maar Muntha Chod Chinta" was released on 16 July 2024. The third single titled "Kya Lafda" was released on 29 July 2024. The fourth single titled "Big Bull" was released on 8 August 2024. The fifth single titled "Mother Song" was released on 17 August 2024.

No.	Title	Lyrics	Singer(s)	Length
1.	"SteppaMaar"	Bhaskarabhatla	Anurag Kulkarni, Sahithi	3:52
2.	"Maar Muntha Chod Chinta"	Kasarla Shyam	Rahul Sipligunj, Keerthana Sharma, Dhanunjay Seepana	3:51
3.	"Kya Lafda"	Sri Harsha Emani	Dhanunjay Seepana, Sindhuja Srinivasan	4:31
4.	"Big Bull"	Bhaskarabhatla	Prudhvi Chandra, Sanjana Kalmanje	4:07
5.	"Mother Song"	Krishna Kanth	Ramya Behara	3:32
Total length:				20:02

== Release ==
=== Theatrical ===
The film was initially set to release on 8 March 2024 (Maha Shivaratri), but was later postponed to 15 August 2024 coinciding with Independence Day. The film received an A (adults only) certification from the Central Board of Film Certification on the account of violence and strong language.

=== Distribution ===
The distribution rights of the film were acquired by Primeshow Entertainment and Mythri Movie Makers. The distribution rights were acquired to Sakthi Film Factory in Tamil Nadu.

=== Home media ===
The digital streaming rights to the film were acquired by Amazon Prime Video for ₹ 33 crore. The satellite rights were sold by Zee Telugu and Zee Cinemalu respectively. The film was premiered on Amazon Prime Video from 5 September 2024.

== Reception ==
BVS Prakash of Deccan Chronicle gave 2/5 stars and wrote "After a flop like Liger, noted director Puri Jagannadh returns with Double iSmart, but the sci-fi plot he has chosen is not exciting enough." Sashidhar Adivi of Times Now gave 2/5 stars and wrote "Double iSmart is a tedious affair!." Sowmya Rajendran of The News Minute gave 1/5 stars and wrote "Puri fries our brain with double the torture." In a negative review, Neeshita Nyayapati of Hindustan Times wrote "Puri Jagannadh focuses so much on making his protagonist likeable that this time around, he forgets to focus on a coherent story."
