= Danish Pratap Sood =

Indian actor and musician

- Born: January 12, 1997 (age 29); New Delhi, India
- Education: Ramjas College (Delhi University); Ambedkar University; Xavier’s Institute of Communications
- Occupations: Actor, singer, songwriter
- Years active: 2011–present
- Known for: Roles in Hindi web series and films; original music for Mismatched Season 2 and Call Me Bae
- Notable work: CAT, Naam Namak Nishan, The Fame Game, Jugaadistan, Hostages, Gulmohar

Danish Pratap Sood is an Indian actor and musician known for his supporting roles in Indian web series and independent films. He has appeared on platforms including Netflix, Amazon Prime Video, Disney+ Hotstar, and Voot. In addition to acting, Sood has composed and released music across streaming platforms such as Spotify, Apple Music, and YouTube Music

== Early life and education ==
Sood was born in Delhi, India. He later moved to Mumbai to pursue a career in the entertainment industry. Details about his formal education and training in acting or music have not been publicly documented.

== Career ==
=== Acting ===
Sood made his web series debut in 2020 with a minor role in A Suitable Boy, directed by Mira Nair, and later appeared in Hostages 2 as a CBI officer. He subsequently featured in Jugaadistan (2022) and The Fame Game (2022), where he portrayed a gay character.

In 2022, he played Sarabjit "Sunny" Singh, the younger brother of the lead character, in the Netflix crime drama CAT.

In 2024, he appeared as Gurbaaz Singh Kahlon, a skeet shooter cadet, in the Amazon miniTV series Naam Namak Nishan. For the role, he reportedly trained with Olympian Rajyavardhan Singh Rathore and international shooter Shriyanka Sadangi.

=== Music ===
Sood is also active as a music producer and songwriter. He has released original tracks across major streaming services. His music typically blends electronic, ambient, and indie-pop styles. Some of his work has been independently reviewed in music blogs and online magazines.

== Media Coverage ==
Sood has been profiled in several Indian media publications, including Rolling Stone India, Mid-Day, The Tribune, and The Times of India. These outlets have highlighted both his acting roles and his independent music projects.

== Filmography ==
=== Web series ===
Year	Title	Role	Platform	Notes	Ref
2020	A Suitable Boy	Supporting role	BBC/Netflix	Debut	
2020	Hostages 2	Rohan (CBI officer)	Disney+ Hotstar	Recurring role	
2022	Jugaadistan	Kabir	Lionsgate Play	Supporting role	
2022	The Fame Game	Samar (Avinash's boyfriend)	Disney+ Hotstar	Supporting role	
2022	CAT	Sarabjit “Sunny” Singh	Netflix	Supporting role	
2024	Naam Namak Nishan	Gurbaaz Singh Kahlon	Amazon miniTV	Lead role	

== Discography ==
- "Jaanu Na" – Mismatched Season 2 (2022)
- "Kyaa Karun" – Call Me Bae (2023)
- "Slow Down" (Single, 2023)
- "Saza" (Single, 2024)
