= The Big Cat =

The Big Cat may refer to:

== People ==
- Johnny Lee Bench (born 1941), Oklahoma, baseball player
- Tom Erikson (born 1964), American amateur wrestler and mixed martial artist
- Andrés Galarraga (born 1961), Venezuelan baseball player
- Ernie Ladd (1938–2007), American wrestler and football player
- Leon Lett (born 1968), American football player
- Earl Lloyd (1928–2015), American basketball player
- Jamaal Magloire (born 1978), Canadian basketball player
- Miloslav Mečíř (born 1964), Slovak tennis player
- Johnny Mize (1913–1993), American baseball player
- Ronnie Robinson (basketball) (1951–2004), American basketball player
- Brad Sweet (born 1985), American professional race car driver
- James Williams (offensive lineman) (born 1968), American football player
- Cleveland Williams (1933–1999), American professional boxer
- Rayfield Wright (1945–2022), American football player
- Andrei Vasilevskiy (born 1994), Russian ice hockey player
- Evan "Big Cat" Williams (born 1948) Professional Golfer and World Long-Drive Champion

== Entertainment ==
- The Big Cat (film), a 1949 film directed by Phil Karlson
- The Big Cats, a band from Little Rock, Arkansas

== See also ==
- Big cat (disambiguation)
- The Cat (disambiguation)
- Big the Cat, a character in the Sonic the Hedgehog video games
