= Kavya Thapar =

Indian actress

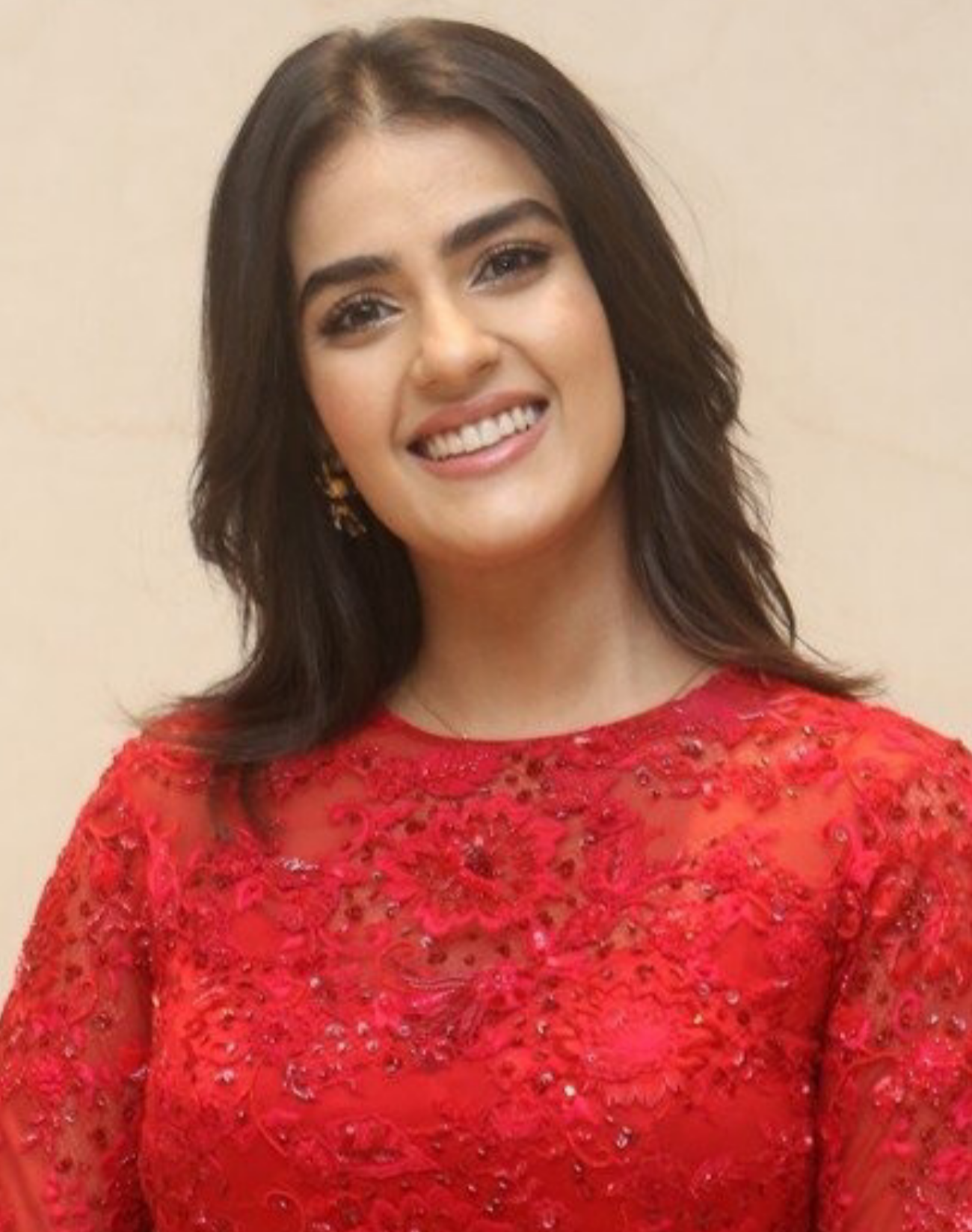
- Kavya in 2023
- Other name: Kavya Praveen Thapar
- Education: Thakur College of Science and Commerce
- Occupation: Actress

Kavya Thapar is an Indian actress who appears in Telugu, Tamil and Hindi films. She made her acting debut with the Telugu film Ee Maaya Peremito in 2018 and has since appeared in Ek Mini Katha (2021), Middle Class Love (2022), marking her Hindi debut, Pichaikkaran 2 (2023), her Tamil debut and Eagle (2024), which became her highest-grossing release.

== Early life ==
Thapar completed her schooling from Bombay Scottish School, Powai. After her schooling, she did her undergraduate studies in Thakur College of Science and Commerce.

== Career ==
Thapar started her career by featuring in a short Hindi film in 2013. She also appeared in several advertisements including Patanjali, MakeMyTrip and Kohinoor.

Her Telugu film Ee Maaya Peremito was released in 2018. This film was her first Telugu film. In 2019 her Tamil film Market Raja MBBS was released. This film was her first Tamil film. Her next film Pichaikkaran 2 was alongside Vijay Antony.

In early October 2022 she has announced her next Telugu film alongside Ravi Teja. Despite the belief and anticipation from Eagle’s makers and lead actor Raviteja, the film failed to resonate with audiences as expected.

== Filmography ==
=== Films ===
Key
†	Denotes films that have not yet been released

List of Kavya Thapar film credits
Year	Title	Role	Language	Notes	Ref.
2018	Ee Maaya Peremito	Sheetal Jain	Telugu		
2019	Market Raja MBBS	Vanishri	Tamil		
2021	Ek Mini Katha	Amrutha	Telugu		
2022	Middle Class Love	Sysha Oberoi	Hindi		
2023	Pichaikkaran 2	Hema	Tamil		
2024	Eagle	Rachana	Telugu		
2024	Ooru Peru Bhairavakona	Agraharam Geetha	Telugu		
2024	Double iSmart	Jannat Mehrunnisa	Telugu		
2024	Viswam	Samira Sarma	Telugu		

=== Television ===
List of Kavya Thapar web series credits
Year	Title	Role	Language	Platform	Notes	Ref.
2021	Kaali Peeli Tales	Suchi	Hindi	YouTube	Episode "Harra Bharra"	
2022	CAT	Kimi Aulakh	Punjabi	Netflix		
2023	Farzi	Ananya	Hindi	Amazon Prime Video		
