= Saandip =

Indian singer and actor

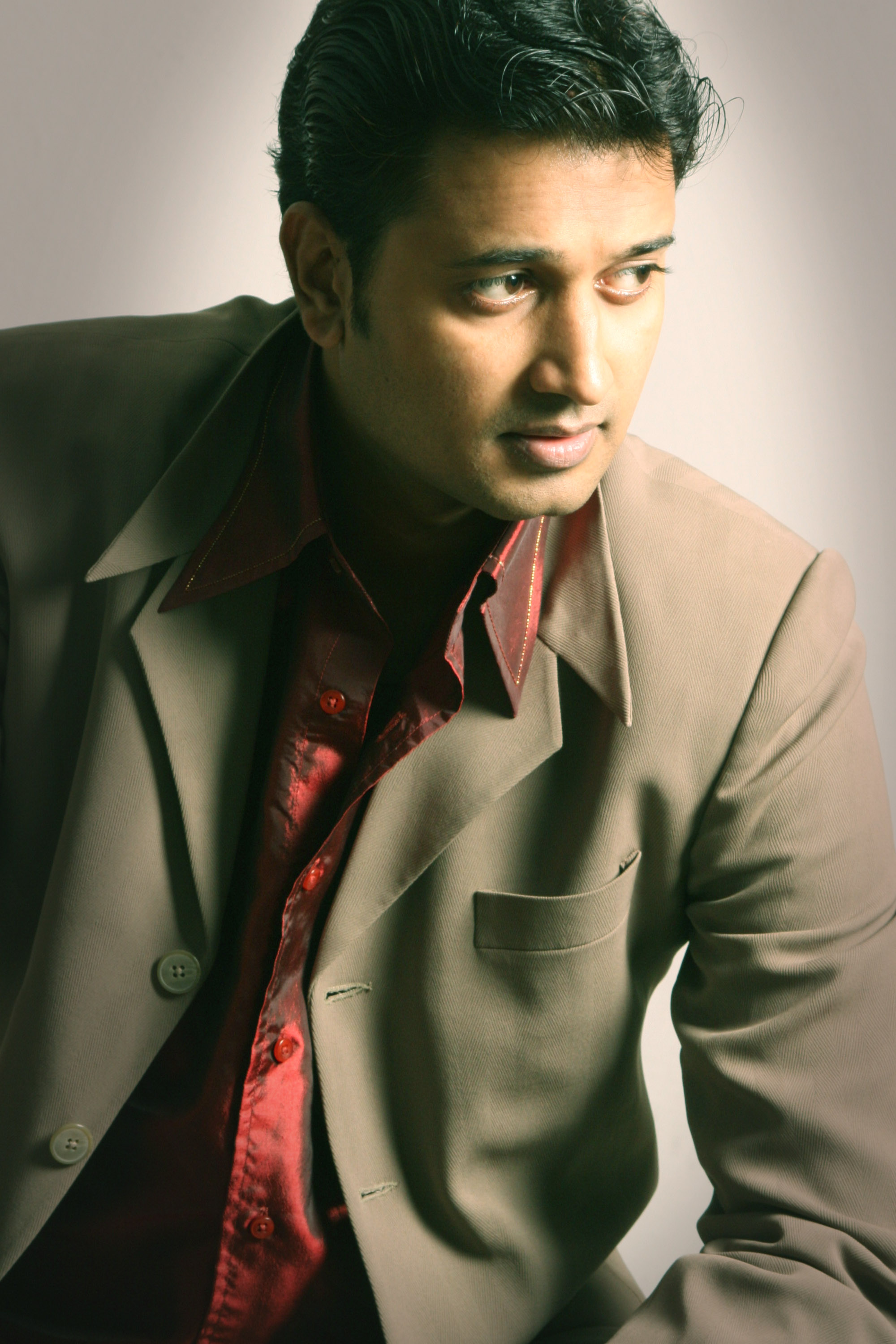

Background information
- Origin: India
- Genres: Playback singing
- Occupations: Singer, actor, dubbing artist, anchor
- Years active: 2000–present

Saandip is an Indian singer and actor. He has given playback to Tollywood and Bollywood movies.

== Career ==
In 1998, Saandip gained recognition – and managed to precede to the final – through the Telugu show, "Padutha Teeyaga", which broadcast on ETV Telugu and was hosted by S. P. Balasubrahmanyam. Saandip acted in Premayanamaha – Love is God and appeared in Inkosari. He has anchored Popular Musical TV show "Sing a Song" on Maa TV and a special musical-lyrical Ugadi episode in ETV.

== Filmography ==
- 2003 – Premayanamaha
- 2010 – Inkosaari
- 2015 – Tiger

== Discography ==
Year	Movie title
2000	Chitram
2001	Family Circus
2001	Nuvvu Nenu
2001	Ramma Chilakamma
2002	Hai
2002	Ninne Ninne Premincha
2002	Nuvve Nenu Nene Nuvvu
2002	Sandade Sandadi
2002	Toli Parichayam
2002	Avunu Valliddaru Ista Paddaru!
2002	June July
2002	Manamiddaram
2002	Thotti Gang
2003	Kalyanam
2003	Neetho Cheppalani
2003	Priya Nuvvenakishtam
2003	Aadanthe Ado Type
2003	Neeto Vastha
2003	Ottu Ee Amayevaro Teleedu
2003	Premayanamaha
2003	Tooniga
2004	Preminchanamma
2004	Gowri
2004	No
2004	Yagnam
2005	123 From Amalapuram
2005	Avunanna Kaadanna
2005	A Film by Aravind
2005	Dhairyam
2005	Kanchanamala Cable TV
2005	Manasa
2005	Nikki & Neeraj
2005	Meenakshi
2006	Bala
2006	Premante Inthe
2006	Pulakintha
2007	Nyayam Kavali
2007	Classmates
2007	Kalyanam
2008	Black & White
2009	Arundhati
2013	Aravind 2
