= Ee Maaya Peremito =

Romantic Telugu movie

- Directed by: Ramu Koppola
- Written by: Ramu Koppola
- Produced by: Divya Vijay
- Starring: Rahul Vijay; Kavya Thapar
- Narrated by: Nani
- Cinematography: Shyam K. Naidu
- Edited by: Naveen Nooli
- Music by: Mani Sharma
- Production company: V.S.Creative Works
- Release date: 21 September 2018
- Running time: 113 minutes
- Country: India
- Language: Telugu

Ee Maaya Peremito (transl. What's the Name of this Magic?) is a 2018 Telugu-language romance film, produced by Divya Vijay on V.S.Creative Works and directed by Ramu Koppula. Starring newcomers Rahul Vijay and Kavya Thapar with music composed by Mani Sharma.

== Plot ==
Chandu is a jobless vagabond and Sheetal is the daughter of a rich businessman. She falls in love with Chandu's good nature but her father, Pramod, objects to the relationship, demanding Chandu to prove he is worthy of his daughter.

== Cast ==
- Rahul Vijay as Sri Ramachandra Murthy "Chandu"
- Kavya Thapar as Sheetal Jain
- Rajendra Prasad as Babu Rao
- Murali Sharma as Pramod Jain
- Posani Krishna Murali
- Satyam Rajesh as Peddodu
- Thagubothu Ramesh
- Chitram Srinu
- Josh Ravi
- Bhadram
- Rallapalli
- Ananth
- Kadambari Kiran
- Vaishnavi Chaitanya as Alekya, Chandu's Sister
- Jogi Raju
- Duvvasi Mohan
- Easwari Rao
- Pavitra Lokesh
- Anju Asrani

== Soundtrack ==
Ee Maaya Peremito

Soundtrack album by Mani Sharma
- Released: 28 July 2018
- Recorded: 2018
- Genre: Feature film soundtrack
- Length: 21:26
- Language: Telugu
- Label: Mango Music
- Producer: Mani Sharma

Mani Sharma chronology
Touch Chesi Chudu (Background Score) (2018)	Ee Maaya Peremito (2018)	Devadas (2018)

The music composed by Mani Sharma. Lyrics were written by Sri Mani. The music was released by Mango Music Company. The audio launch was held on 28 July at Hyderabad.

No.	Title	Singer(s)	Length
1.	"Arihanthanam"	Anurag Kulkarni, Sahithi Chaganti	4:39
2.	"Manchipere"	Anurag Kulkarni	4:27
3.	"Suryudike Neruga"	Anudeep Dev, Sahithi Chaganti	4:30
4.	"Okate Pranamai"	Deepu	3:55
5.	"Nalo Nenu"	Hemanth	3:55
Total length:			21:26

== Controversy ==
The Jain community raised objections over the use of a sacred Jain religious hymn in the movie's Arihanthanam song.
