= Çat Dam =

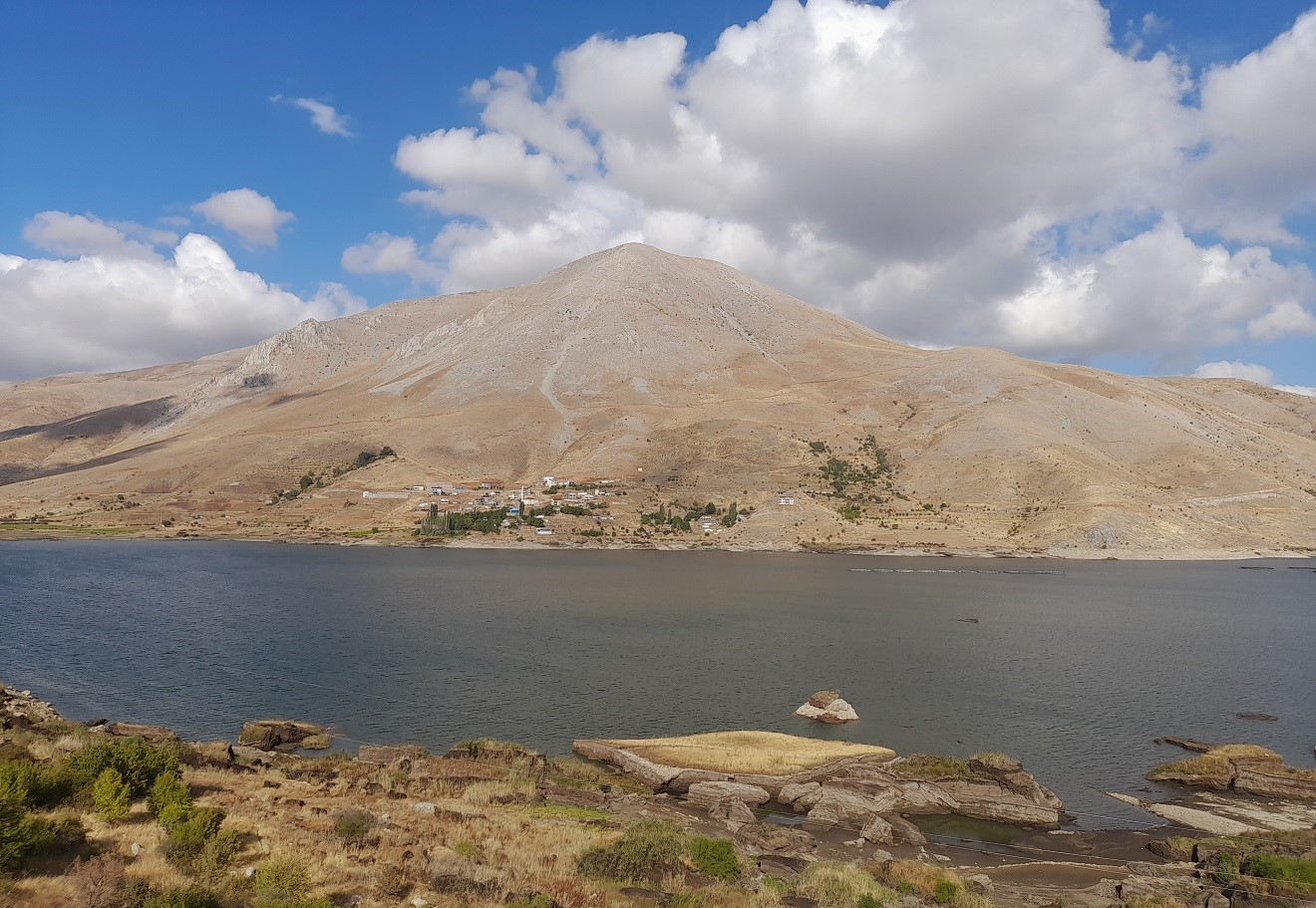

- Location within Turkey
- Official name: Çat Baraji
- Country: Turkey
- Location: Çelikhan
- Coordinates: 38°04′04″N 38°18′45″E
- Status: Operational
- Construction began: 1985
- Opening date: 2002
- Owner: Turkish State Hydraulic Works

Dam and spillways
- Type of dam: Embankment
- Impounds: Abdülharap River
- Height: 64.5 m (212 ft)
- Dam volume: 2,500,000 m^{3} (2,027 acre⋅ft)

Reservoir
- Total capacity: 240,000,000 m^{3} (194,571 acre⋅ft)
- Surface area: 14.3 km^{2} (6 mi^{2})

The Çat Dam is an embankment dam on the Abdülharap River, located near Çelikhan in Adıyaman Province, Turkey. Constructed between 1985 and 2002, the development was backed by the Turkish State Hydraulic Works. The purpose of the dam is irrigation and it provides water for up to 21,464 ha (53,039 acres) of land.

== See also ==
- List of dams and reservoirs in Turkey
