= Sundeep Kishan =

Indian actor and producer

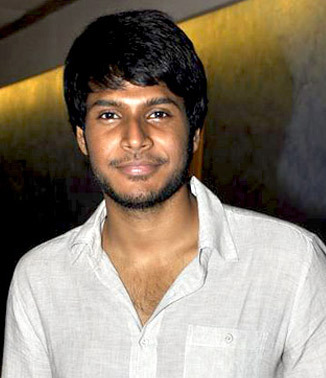
- Kishan in 2015
- Born: 7 May 1987 (age 39); Madras, Tamil Nadu, India
- Occupations: Actor; producer
- Years active: 2010–present
- Relatives: Chota K. Naidu (uncle); Shyam K. Naidu (uncle)

Sundeep Kishan (born 7 May 1987) is an Indian actor and producer who primarily works in Telugu and Tamil films. Kishan made his acting debut with Prasthanam (2010) and had his career breakthrough with the 2013 films Gundello Godari and Venkatadri Express. Following a career downturn, he achieved critical and commercial success with Maanagaram (2017), Maayavan (2017), A1 Express (2021), Gully Rowdy (2021), Captain Miller (2024) and Raayan (2024). The last of these is his highest grossing film.

== Early life ==
Sundeep Kishan Naidu was born in a Telugu family in Madras (present-day Chennai). He is the nephew to the cinematographers Chota K. Naidu and Shyam K. Naidu. He moved to Hyderabad in 2008 to pursue a career in films.

== Career ==
Sundeep Kishan worked as assistant director to Gautham Vasudev Menon for a year, before starring in Sneha Geetham (2010). Kishan made his acting debut with Prasthanam in the same year. Director Deva Katta referred Kishan to his friends Raj Nidimoru and Krishna D.K., which led to Kishan's casting in his first Hindi venture, Shor in the City (2011). Taran Adarsh felt he was "first-rate" and displayed vulnerability with natural ease. Kishan then appeared in Yaaruda Mahesh (2013). The actor says that he has resolved not to venture into such genres any more despite it being the order of the day in Tamil cinema and even though he has been approached for a sequel to the film.

Sundeep Kishan's major breakthrough came with his another 2013 release Venkatadri Express opposite Rakul Preet Singh. The film was a commercial success. Jeevi from Idlebrain.com noted, "Sundeep Kishan excels as a solo commercial hero with right amount of performance and also dances well in the introduction scene." He then appeared in Gundello Godari, which earned him nomination for Filmfare Award for Best Supporting Actor – Telugu. It was a box office success too.

Following several poorly received films, Sundeep Kishan's career marked a turning point in 2017. He first appeared in Maanagaram opposite Regina Cassandra, as the rugged young man. The film was a box office success. Anupama Subramanian of Deccan Chronicle noted, "Sundeep with his new makeover of a rugged person is impressive. He is full of energy and sparkles in action sequences." Then in Maayavan, he played a crime inspector opposite Lavanya Tripathi. The film emerged a moderate success. Manoj Kumar R was appreciative of him for playing his character well.

Sundeep Kishan turned into producer too with Ninu Veedani Needanu Nene (2019), A1 Express (2021) which fared decently at the box office. He expanded to web with the series The Family Man (2019) and his performance in the spy thriller was widely appreciated. Later, he starred in the Telugu action thriller Michael (2023).

Sundeep Kishan had three film releases in 2024. He first appeared alongside Dhanush as a tribal in Captain Miller. The film received positive response and was a commercial success. In Ooru Peru Bhairavakona, he appeared as a stunt body double caught in a mysterious situation. Sangeetha Devi Dundoo stated that he delivers a "convincing performance". Kishan then played an alcoholic who turns against his brother (played by Dhanush) in Raayan. Janani K noted, "Sundeep Kishan gets a meatier role and lives upto his character." A box office success, it emerged as the highest-grossing Tamil film of the year.

In 2025, Sundeep Kishan first appeared in Mazaka, as Rao Ramesh's son. BH Harsh of Cinema Express stated, "Sundeep Kishan struggles to match Ramesh's unhinged energy but shares an endearing chemistry with the actor, and the two salvage many mediocre scenes with their timing." It was a box office failure.

== Other work ==
Sundeep Kishan owns a restaurant chain in Hyderabad named Vivaha Bhojanambhu. He started a salon Express Unisex in Vijayawada.

== Filmography ==
Key
| † | Denotes films that have not yet been released |

=== Films ===
| Year | Title | Role | Language | Notes | Ref. |
|---|---|---|---|---|---|
| 2010 | Prasthanam | Chinna | Telugu | | |
| 2010 | Sneha Geetham | Arjun | Telugu | | |
| 2011 | Shor in the City | Sawan Murthy | Hindi | | |
| 2011 | It's My Love Story | Himself | Telugu | Special appearance in the song "Gallate" | |
| 2012 | Routine Love Story | Sanju | Telugu | | |
| 2013 | Gundello Godari | Suri | Telugu | | |
| 2013 | Yaaruda Mahesh | Shiva | Tamil | | |
| 2013 | Venkatadri Express | Sundeep | Telugu | | |
| 2013 | D for Dopidi | Raju | Telugu | | |
| 2014 | Ra Ra Krishnayya | Krishnayya "Kittu" | Telugu | | |
| 2014 | Joru | Sundeep | Telugu | | |
| 2015 | Beeruva | Sanju | Telugu | | |
| 2015 | Tiger | Tiger | Telugu | | |
| 2016 | Run | Sanjay | Telugu | | |
| 2016 | Okka Ammayi Thappa | Krishna Vachan | Telugu | | |
| 2017 | Maanagaram | Jeeva | Tamil | | |
| 2017 | Shamanthakamani | Kotipalli Siva | Telugu | | |
| 2017 | Nakshatram | Rama Rao | Telugu | | |
| 2017 | C/O Surya | Surya | Telugu | Bilingual film | |
| 2017 | Nenjil Thunivirundhal | Kumar | Tamil | Bilingual film | |
| 2017 | Maayavan | Kumaran | Tamil | | |
| 2018 | Manasuku Nachindi | Suraj | Telugu | | |
| 2018 | Next Enti? | Sanju | Telugu | | |
| 2019 | Ninu Veedani Needanu Nene (Note: Simultaneously shot in Tamil as Kannaadi but the Tamil version remains unreleased.) | Rishi / Arjun | Telugu | Also producer | |
| 2019 | Tenali Ramakrishna BA. BL | Adv. Tenali Ramakrishna | Telugu | | |
| 2021 | A1 Express | Sundeep "Sanju" Naidu | Telugu | Also producer | |
| 2021 | Vivaha Bhojanambu | Nellore Prabha | Telugu | Extended cameo; also producer | |
| 2021 | Kasada Tabara | Kanda | Tamil | | |
| 2021 | Gully Rowdy | Vasu | Telugu | | |
| 2023 | Michael | Michael | Telugu | Partially reshot in Tamil | |
| 2024 | Captain Miller | Captain Rafiq | Tamil | | |
| 2024 | Ooru Peru Bhairavakona | Basavalingam "Basava" | Telugu | | |
| 2024 | Raayan | Muthuvelraayan "Muthu" | Tamil | | |
| 2025 | Mazaka | Krishna Ramana | Telugu | | |
| 2026 | Sigma | Guru | Tamil | | |
| TBA | PowerPeta | Senapati Ravi | Telugu | | |
| 2027 | Karikaala Chapter 1 | TBA | Telugu | | |
| 2027 | Kaarikala Chapter-2 | TBA | Telugu | | |

=== Television ===
| Year | Title | Role | Network | Notes | Ref. |
|---|---|---|---|---|---|
| 2013 | 60th Filmfare Awards South | Himself (host) | MAA TV | | |
| 2018 | 65th Filmfare Awards South | Himself (host) | Star Maa | Television special | |
| 2019–2025 | The Family Man | Major Vikram | Amazon Prime Video | Hindi series | |
| 2021 | 9th South Indian International Movie Awards | Himself (host) | Gemini TV | Television special | |
| 2023 | 69th Filmfare Awards South | Himself (host) | Star Maa | Television special | |
| 2026 | Super Subbu | Chilukuri Subramanya Rao "Subbu" | Netflix | | |

== Awards and nominations ==
| Year | Award | Category | Film | Result | Ref. |
|---|---|---|---|---|---|
| 2014 | Filmfare Awards South | Best Supporting Actor – Telugu | Gundello Godari | Nominated | |
