= Eagle (2024 film) =

2024 Indian Telugu action thriller film

- Theatrical release poster
- Directed by: Karthik Gattamneni
- Screenplay by: Karthik Gattamneni; Manibabu Karanam
- Story by: Karthik Gattamneni
- Produced by: T. G. Vishwa Prasad; Vivek Kuchibhotla
- Starring: Ravi Teja; Anupama Parameswaran; Kavya Thapar; Navdeep; Vinay Rai
- Cinematography: Karthik Gattamneni; Kamil Plocki; Karm Chawla
- Edited by: Karthik Gattamneni
- Music by: Davzand
- Production company: People Media Factory
- Distributed by: UFO Moviez B4U Films
- Release date: 9 February 2024
- Running time: 156 minutes
- Country: India
- Language: Telugu
- Budget: ₹35 crore

Eagle is a 2024 Indian Telugu-language action thriller film written and directed by Karthik Gattamneni and produced by T. G. Vishwa Prasad and Vivek Kuchibhotla under People Media Factory. It stars Ravi Teja in the titular role alongside Anupama Parameswaran, Kavya Thapar, Navdeep and Vinay Rai.

The film was officially announced on 12 June 2023. The background score and soundtrack were composed by Davzand, with cinematography and editing handled by Gattamneni himself.

Eagle was released in theatres worldwide on 9 February 2024 to mixed reviews from critics.

== Plot ==
The story follows Nalini Rao, an investigative journalist who writes a brief article about a rare variety of cotton grown in Talakona, a remote region in Andhra Pradesh. Unexpectedly, her article draws the attention of India's top intelligence officials, whose suspicious response signals that the cotton and its cultivator may be connected to a larger mystery. Intrigued, Nalini travels to Talakona to investigate.

In Talakona, she meets Sahadev Varma, a reclusive cotton farmer admired locally for producing exceptionally fine cotton with international demand. As Nalini interviews villagers and reviews historical records, she notices inconsistencies in Sahadev's background. Multiple sources—including former military personnel, intelligence officers, and locals—describe him with a mix of fear and respect, suggesting he is more than a typical farmer.

Through flashbacks and testimonies, Nalini discovers that Sahadev is actually “Eagle”, a former covert operative for Indian intelligence renowned for precision sniping and black-ops missions across Asia. Presumed dead, Eagle had retired in secrecy and chosen to live quietly in Talakona.

Sahadev's cotton farm is revealed as a cover for a global sting operation: he uses cotton exports to trace illegal arms smuggling routes. By making his cotton highly sought after internationally, he identifies networks involved in moving weapons and works to dismantle a large underground arms syndicate.

As Nalini completes her article, her investigation triggers danger. Sahadev faces threats from international arms dealers, local Naxalite groups, terrorist organizations, and corrupt politicians, while Indian intelligence considers him a liability. Only his old friend and former RAW agent, Jay, urges him to disappear again. Sahadev, however, decides to confront the threats directly.

The story culminates in a series of high-stakes action sequences, where Sahadev skillfully combats heavily armed enemies to expose the syndicate. By the end, his true identity becomes public. While he survives, his peaceful life is irreversibly disrupted. The film concludes with an open-ended resolution, hinting at potential future conflicts for Eagle.

== Cast ==
- Ravi Teja as Sahadev Varma alias "Eagle"
- Navdeep as Jay, Sahadev's friend and right-hand man
- Vinay Rai as Kali Pratap, an Anglo-Indian police officer and Suhana's father
- Anupama Parameswaran as Nalini Rao, a journalist
- Kavya Thapar as Rachana, Sahadev's wife
- Madhoo as Gayatri Devi, RAW chief
- Srinivas Avasarala as Pramod, a RAW agent
- Ajay Ghosh as MLA Someshwar Reddy
- Srinivasa Reddy as Vikas, Someshwar Reddy's secretary
- Ashvin Raja as Seenayya
- Bhasha as Penchala
- Mirchi Kiran as Chengal Reddy
- Sivannarayana Naripeddi as Venkanna
- Praneetha Patnaik as Padmakka
- Surya as Ramaraju
- Seshi Rao as Altaf
- Master Dhruvan as Govindu
- Madee Manepalli as Luna Suresh
- Baby Zara as Suhana
- Pradeep as Robin Singh
- Bharath Reddy as Daily Herald MD
- Akshara as Khyati
- Nithin Mehta as Rajesh Rumani
- David Price as Pedro Pascal

== Soundtrack ==
Music is composed by Davzand.

Track list
No.	Title	Lyrics	Singer(s)	Length
1.	"Aadu Macha"	Kalyan Chakravarthy	Rahul Sipligunj	3:31
2.	"Gallanthe"	Krishna Kanth	Kapil Kapilan, Lynn	3:37
3.	"Eagle's On His Way"	Georginaa Mathew	Georginaa Mathew	2:46
4.	"Garudam"	Chaitanya Prasad	Sri Krishna	3:29
5.	"Hey Garuda"	Krishna Kanth	Harika Narayan, Hemachandra Vedala	3:29
Total length:				16:02

== Release ==
=== Theatrical ===
Eagle was earlier announced to release on 13 January 2024, coinciding with Makar Sankranti. However, it was postponed to 9 February 2024 due to the clash of multiple films at the Tollywood box office during the Sankranti weekend.

=== Home media ===
The post-theatrical streaming rights were jointly acquired by Amazon Prime Video, Aha, ETV WIN, and Sun NXT. The satellite rights were acquired by Star Maa.

== Reception ==
Paul Nicodemus of The Times of India gave 3/5 stars and wrote, "While the film may struggle to maintain a consistent narrative pace, its action sequences and Ravi Teja's performance stand out as highlights and compensate for the lacunae".

Avad of OTTplay gave 2.5/5 stars and wrote, "Eagle is a stylized action drama that has some great fight sequences in the second half. Ravi Teja kills it in his new look and powerful role. But the storyline lacks novelty, emotions do not work, and the setup looks a bit over the top. All those who love action films can give this film a shot". Janani. K of India Today gave 2.5/5 stars and wrote "'Eagle’ has some brilliant action pieces and the slow-motion shots elevate those sequences. Where it lacks is in its writing. It needs more punch and new ideas to keep things going for more than two and a half hours. It gets exhausting to see people sing praises of the hero without moving the story forward."

Raghu Bandi of The Indian Express gave 2/5 stars and wrote "Eagle might not be a bad watch if you temper your expectations. It is definitely not a regular Ravi Teja film". Balakrishna Ganesan of The News Minute gave 1.5/5 stars and wrote "'Eagle’ tries its best to mimic 'KGF', but director Karthik Gattamneni fails to pull off Prashanth Neel’s grip over direction and screenplay".

Ram Venkat Srikar of Film Companion wrote, "Eagle aims to be different but some of its creative choices feel are good While it's hard not to be reminded of some films while watching Eagle, there are moments where it does fly high. But you only wish it soared higher". Sangeetha Devi Dundoo of The Hindu wrote "Director Karthik Gattamneni's ‘Eagle’, headlined by Ravi Teja, has a bunch of interesting ideas and fun action segments but needs sharper writing".
