= Tiger (2015 film) =

- Theatrical Release Poster
- Directed by: Vi Anand
- Screenplay by: Vi Anand
- Dialogues by: Abburi Ravi
- Story by: Vi Anand
- Produced by: NV Prasad
- Starring: Sundeep Kishan; Seerat Kapoor; Rahul Ravindran
- Cinematography: Chota K. Naidu
- Edited by: Chota K. Prasad
- Music by: S. Thaman
- Production company: NVR Cinema
- Release date: 26 June 2015
- Running time: 120 minutes
- Country: India
- Language: Telugu

Tiger is a 2015 Indian Telugu-language action film directed by Vi Anand and produced by NV Prasad under NVR Cinema. The film stars Sundeep Kishan, Seerat Kapoor and Rahul Ravindran.

Tiger was released on 26 June 2015 to positive reviews from critics.

== Plot ==
The story begins with Vishnu (Rahul Ravindran) being chased by goons on the banks of Ganga river in Varanasi. While he is trying to escape, his bike is hit by a car, and he gets severely hurt in the accident. While he is fighting for his life, he narrates the story of his love and friendship.

Vishnu is an orphan and Tiger (Sundeep Kishan) is his best friend in the orphanage who is staying in Visakhapatnam. Tiger does anything for his friend Vishnu. Vishnu falls in love with a girl called Ganga from Banaras Hindu University, who attends the symposium. Misunderstandings occur between Tiger and Vishnu due to Ganga, and Vishnu asks Tiger not to meet him anymore. Eventually, Vishnu lands in trouble while trying to elope with Ganga. Vishnu is seen and taken to the hospital by a person (Saandip) passing by that road in a new car. Before undertaking surgery in the hospital, Vishnu gives Tiger's phone number to doctors, and they try to contact Tiger. Meanwhile, Ganga is under the custody of their Caste Panchayat leaders who decides to Kill her for tarnishing their reputation of caste her father and grandfather also involved in this. When finally the goons about to kill Vishnu Tiger comes into rescue takes comatose Vishnu with him later however he manages to rescue Ganga also.

Then in a final battle Tiger bashes Ganga's father and his gang and successfully escapes with Vishnu and Ganga who is now recovered.

== Cast ==
- Sundeep Kishan as Tiger
- Rahul Ravindran as Vishnu
- Seerat Kapoor as Ganga
- Saandip as person who admits Vishnu in hospital
- Tanikella Bharani as Orphanage Principal
- Y. Kasi Viswanath as Vishnu's foster father
- Nagendra Babu as College Symposium Chief Guest
- Saptagiri
- Praveen as Tiger's friend
- Venu Yeldandi as Tiger's friend
- Sudigali Sudheer as Tiger's friend
- Josh Ravi as Tiger's friend
- Satya as Software Engineer
- Snigdha as Ganga's friend
- Fish Venkat as Goon
- Raghu Karumanchi as Goon
- Thagubothu Ramesh as Mortuary Drunkard
- Doraiswamy Iyer as Ganga's grandfather

== Soundtrack ==
The music was composed by S. Thaman and released by Junglee Music.

Tiger

Soundtrack album by S. Thaman
- Released: Feb 18, 2015
- Recorded: 2015
- Genre: Soundtrack
- Length: 18:19
- Label: Junglee Music
- Producer: S. Thaman

S. Thaman chronology
Beeruva (2015)	Tiger (2015)	Savaale Samaali (2015)

Track list
No.	Title	Lyrics	Singer(s)	Length
1.	"Samayaa Samayaa Idi"	Ananta Sriram	Anudeep Dev, S. Thaman	4:02
2.	"Vadduraa Maama Vadduraa"	Bhaskarabhatla Ravi Kumar	Nivas	4:10
3.	"Luvvu Story Cheppana"	Ananta Sriram	Deepak	4:22
4.	"Tiger Yeh Tiger"	Bhaskarabhatla Ravi Kumar	Sooraj Santhosh, Suchith Suresan	4:07
5.	"Tiger - Movie Theme"		Instrumental	1:38
Total length:				18:19

== Reception ==
Jeevi of Idlebrain.com wrote that "It’s a tight script with a well written screenplay. Except for a few forced comedy scenes, the entire film runs organically".
