= C.A.T.: Cyber Attack Team =

2003 video game

- Cover art
- Developer(s): Hyde, Medix
- Publisher(s): Medix
- Platform(s): Xbox
- Release: JP: June 26, 2003
- Genre(s): Turn-based tactics
- Mode(s): Single-player

C.A.T.: Cyber Attack Team (C.A.T 〜サイバーアタックチーム〜) is an adventure game co-developed by Hyde and Medix and published by Medix exclusively in Japan. The game's characters were designed by famous character designer and animator Atsuko Nakajima.

== Summary ==
The game's plot involves the titular Cyber Attack Team defending cyberspace inside a computer network from evil viruses and monsters. The game consists of ten chapters, with each one divided into "adventure" and "simulation" sections.
