= Cat (nickname) =

Cat is a nickname, often a short form (hypocorism) of Catherine, Katherine, or cognate names. Individuals who have used the name include the following:

== Women ==
- Cat Burns (born 2000), Liberian-English singer-songwriter
- Cat Cora (born 1967), American chef
- Cat Deeley (born 1976), English television presenter, actress, singer and model
- Cat Glover (1962–2024), American choreographer, dancer and singer
- Catriona Gray (born 1994), Filipino-Australian beauty queen, Miss Universe 2018
- Cat Hulbert (1950–2022), American gambler
- Cat Jarman (born 1982), Norwegian archaeologist and television presenter
- Cat Osterman (born 1983), American collegiate softball pitcher
- Cat Smith (born 1985), English politician
- Catriona Sparks (born 1965), Australian science fiction writer, editor and publisher
- Cat Whitehill (born 1982), American soccer player and coach
- Cat Zingano (born 1982), American mixed martial arts fighter

== Men ==
- Cat Anderson (1916–1981), American jazz trumpeter
- Ellis Clary (1916–2000), American baseball player, coach and scout
- Cat Doucet (1899–1975), American politician and sheriff
