= Cat (TV series) =

Indian crime thriller series

- Genre: Crime; Drama; Thriller
- Created by: Balwinder Singh Janjua
- Written by: Balwinder Singh Janjua; Rupinder Chahal; Anil Rodhan; Jimmy Singh (Anutej Singh)
- Directed by: Balwinder Singh Janjua; Rupinder Chahal; Jimmy Singh (Anutej Singh)
- Starring: Randeep Hooda; Suvinder Vicky; Hasleen Kaur; Geeta Agarwal Sharma; Dakssh Ajit Singh; Danish Sood; Jaipreet Singh; Sukhwinder Chahal; KP Singh; Kavya Thapar
- Theme music composer: Rakesh Vema
- Composer: Joel Crasto
- Country of origin: India
- Original language: Punjabi
- No. of seasons: 1
- No. of episodes: 8

Production
- Producers: Balwinder Singh Janjua; Panchali Chakraverty
- Cinematography: Arvind Krishna
- Editor: Umesh Gupta
- Camera setup: Multi-camera
- Running time: 45 minutes
- Production companies: Movie Tunnel Production; Jelly Bean Entertainment

Original release
- Network: Netflix
- Release: 9 December 2022

Cat (stylized in all caps) is a 2022 Indian Punjabi-language crime thriller television series created and written by Balwinder Singh Janjua, Rupinder Chahal, Anil Rodhan and Jimmy Singh for Netflix. It stars Randeep Hooda, Suvinder Vicky, Hasleen Kaur, Geeta Agarwal Sharma, Dakssh Ajit Singh, Danish Sood, Jaipreet Singh, Sukhwinder Chahal, KP Singh and Kavya Thapar. This is the first streaming series of Hooda and Netflix first India originals in Punjabi language.

== Plot ==
Gurnam, who worked as a CAT for the police, during the Insurgency of the 1990s in Punjab, saves his brother Sunny from a drug peddling case with the help of a cop named Sehtab Singh. Gurnam is again hired by Sehtab to work as a spy and provide information about the drug-peddling activities in the city. While working with Sehtab, Gurnam discovers that his parents' killer Baljit Singh Rajpuria and Sehtab are in cahoots together. This information enrages Gurnam, where he forgets his mission and is now hell-bent on avenging his parents' death.

== Cast ==
- Randeep Hooda as Gurnam Singh/Gary, informer of police inspector Sehtab Singh
  - Abhishant Rana as teen Gary
- Danish Sood as Sunny/Sarabjit Singh, Gurnam's brother
- Suvinder Vicky as Inspector Sehtab Singh, Police station Jalandhar, Punjab Police
- Geeta Agarwal Sharma as Madam Aulakh
  - Neha Pawar as young Madam Aulakh
- Kavya Thapar as Kimi Aulakh, Madam Aulakh's daughter
- Rehmat Ratan as Keerat Aulakh, Madam Aulakh's daughter
- Ajay Bhardwaj as Darbara Singh Aulakh
- Varun Narang as SSP Kamlesh Arora
- KP Singh as Jaggi Pradhan
- Sonpreet Jhawanda as Bikramjeet Singh, STF Inspector
- Gurinder Makna as Baljit Singh Rajpuria/Bill
- Jaipreet Singh as Shamsher Singh
- Sukhwinder Chahal as Mukhtyar Singh
- Pramod Pathak as Police Inspector Chandan Kumar
- Dakssh Ajit Singh as Lakhwinder Singh/Laadi
- Coral Bhamra as Sweety
- Hasleen Kaur as sub-inspector Babita
- Manish Gulati as Monty Singh
- Eklavey Kashyap as Rocky Ranjha
- Elisha Mayor as Seher Batra
- Sachin Negi as Heera
- Ramandeep Yadav as Saaba
- Emily R Acland as Natalia

== Filming ==
The season 1 of the series was shot over 80 locations across Punjab and no single scene was shot on a set.

== Episodes ==
No.	Title	Directed by	Written by	Original release date
1	"The Deal"	Balwinder Singh Janjua	Balwinder Singh Janjua, Rupinder Chahal, Anil Rodhan, Jimmy Singh	December 9, 2022
2	"The Invasion"	Rupinder Chahal	Balwinder Singh Janjua, Rupinder Chahal, Anil Rodhan, Jimmy Singh	December 9, 2022
3	"The Imposter"	Jimmy Singh	Balwinder Singh Janjua, Rupinder Chahal, Anil Rodhan, Jimmy Singh	December 9, 2022
4	"The Takeover"	Balwinder Singh Janjua	Balwinder Singh Janjua, Rupinder Chahal, Anil Rodhan, Jimmy Singh	December 9, 2022
5	"The Crossroad"	Jimmy Singh	Balwinder Singh Janjua, Rupinder Chahal, Anil Rodhan, Jimmy Singh	December 9, 2022
6	"The Escape"	Balwinder Singh Janjua	Balwinder Singh Janjua, Rupinder Chahal, Anil Rodhan, Jimmy Singh	December 9, 2022
7	"The Deceit"	Balwinder Singh Janjua	Balwinder Singh Janjua, Rupinder Chahal, Anil Rodhan, Jimmy Singh	December 9, 2022
8	"The Masterplan"	Rupinder Chahal	Balwinder Singh Janjua, Rupinder Chahal, Anil Rodhan, Jimmy Singh	December 9, 2022

== Release ==
CAT released on Netflix on 9 December 2022.

== Reception ==
Anuj Kumar for The Hindu wrote "In the beginning, Randeep seems to be surrounded by lesser actors but as the series progresses, the earthiness of the characters renders a raw appeal. Suvinder aces the part of the two-faced police officer, Dakssh Ajeet Singh is absolutely believable as the sportsman-turned-criminal, and Abhishant Rana delivers the goods as the young Gurnam. So does the ever-reliable Pramod Pathak as the slimy cop. The performances are in sync with the locations, dialect, background score, and editing pattern and have not been dressed up to match the perceived global taste of the streaming audience."

Troy Ribeiro for The Free Press Journal gave 4/5 star rating and wrote "Diving deep into the skin of the character, it is Abhishant Rana’s intense performance as the young Gary that helps Randeep slip into the boots of Gurnam Singh with ease. Both are outstanding in their respective roles, as they leave an indelible mark on the screen."

Subhash K. Jha for Firstpost wrote "Morality may go fly a kite. CAT tells us, the more we seek to find a moral centre to the world of crime the less the chances of getting anywhere close to a resolution to the moral dilemma."

Abhimanyu Mathur for the Hindustan Times wrote "CAT’s novelty lies in its understanding of its setting, the earthiness of Punjab, and the lingo, of course. The show has its faults but that novelty and a stellar cast more than makes up for it."

Nandini Ramnath for Scroll.in wrote "The secondary roles are staffed by a memorable array of local actors who lend the series authenticity. These include a delightful pair of twin hawala handlers – props to the casting company Anti-Casting for finding these gents."

Zinia Bandyopadhyay for India Today wrote "The series excels because it remains truthful with its depiction. It does not mince or hold anything back in showing violence and gore in a world where danger and deceit lurk at every corner and the series sets the tone right at the very beginning."

Deepa Gahlot for Rediff.com wrote "The series has several Sikh characters and is in Punjabi, so many viewers might need subtitles. But the language, locations, production design, costumes bring an authenticity to CAT that is praiseworthy."

Archika Khurana for The Times of India wrote "Midway through, the series becomes overly indulgent and sluggish. It’s also intensely dark, with some gory killings making you cringe."

Yatamanyu Narain for News18 wrote "CAT might have borrowed themes from its predecessors but it is a unique show in itself as it pertains to a vivid and macroscopic look into the plight of Punjabi hinterlands coalesced together by a compelling story and even more expeditious characters. With everything said and done, the climax of CAT might not appeal to those who are not a big fan of cliffhangers because it maintains the ‘apogee’ achieved over the course of the eight episodes for the next season."

Sanchita Jhunjhunwala for Zoom TV wrote "If crime-thriller is a genre you enjoy, be rest assured to remain hooked to the Netflix series through and through."

== See also ==
- List of Netflix India originals
