= Data Terminal Ready =

Control signal

Data Terminal Ready (DTR) is a control signal in RS-232 serial communications, transmitted from data terminal equipment (DTE), such as a computer, to data communications equipment (DCE), for example a modem, to indicate that the terminal is ready for communications and the modem may initiate a communications channel.

The DTR signal is present on pin 20 of the 22-wire RS-232 interface using a DB-25 connector, and on pin 4 of a newer DE-9 serial port. The signal is asserted (logic "1") by raising the voltage of the pin from negative to positive. Dropping the signal back to its negative state indicates to the modem that the communications session shall be terminated.

== Signaling for modems ==
The DTR signal is an important call control signal for a data modem. According to the RS232 standard, dropping DTR from active to inactive for at least two seconds tells the modem to disconnect (end) a call or data connection. When a modem is being used for automatic answering (such as with the command ATS0=1), the DTR signal confirms to the modem that the computer is available to accept a call.

When a computer wants to place a call, it asserts the DTR signal before sending commands. If the DTR signal is not asserted and the modem receives a dial command, modems either refuse to place the call, or they silently disable DTR support for the duration of that call; the actual behavior depends on the modem software.

Other aspects of responses to changes in DTR can be manually overridden or configured on most newer modems. and higher values are used by some vendors.

Many external modems have LED indicators on the front, one of which is TR ("terminal ready"). This light follows the state of the DTR pin. The light is on when DTR is high, and off when it is low. Modems will typically keep the TR light illuminated when the AT&D0 command is used to force the modem to ignore the DTR signal, regardless of the pin's actual state.

== Null modem operation ==
When a serial connection is made between two computers using a null modem adapter, the DTR and the Data Carrier Detect (DCD) lines are typically paired. This allows both ends of the connection to sense when the connection is active.

On many operating systems, including Windows, the DTR line is held low while the serial port is unused and not being controlled by any applications.

== Use for flow control ==
On some printers with serial interfaces, the DTR line is used for hardware flow control, similar to the use of RTS and CTS for modems. This practice is not consistent; other printers define RTS for this same purpose.

When DTR is used for flow control, it manages the flow of data from the printer to the computer. However, because during printing, the bulk of the data is from the computer to the printer, the importance of flow control in the opposite direction is minimal.

== Use as a power pin ==
On some hardware the DTR line (along with RTS) may be used to provide power. The most notable example of this is a serial mouse. The DE-9 serial port on the PC does not provide any dedicated power source. The mouse driver holds the DTR and RTS lines high at all times so that the device has a source of power.

Another category of devices commonly powered by the DTR line includes converters between RS-232 and other serial standards such as RS-422 and RS-485.

== Use for transmit keying ==
In many radio modem implementations, especially in amateur radio, the DTR is used to control transmission. The radio receives when DTR is not asserted, typically passing audio in to a software modem. When DTR is asserted the radio transmits audio coming from the software modem. In cases where the radio is controlled by serial commands (e.g. a computer aided transceiver interface) the control data flows regardless of DTR state.

== See also ==
- Ring Indicator
