= Computer aided transceiver =

Device for controlling a transceiver radio receiver

Computer aided transceiver (CAT) is a non-generic serial protocol used by radio amateurs for (remotely) controlling a transceiver or a radio receiver equipment using a computer.

Conventional radios are manually controlled using buttons, dials, etc. However, advances in electronics have permitted the development of devices that can be controlled by a computer. This facilitates e.g. the use of digital modes such as packet radio or simplifies satellite operation, because the necessary changes in frequency, caused by the Doppler effect, can be performed automatically. To this end, the transceiver and the computer are connected with a purpose-built CAT interface, the process is controlled by a CAT program. Each radio or controller has unique hardware and a unique set of features which are addressed in the specific manuals.

CAT interfaces can also be used to orient tracking antennas to follow the movement of satellites.

A CAT interface is a piece of hardware connecting the PC and the radio, allowing the devices communicate with each other. The signals are provided as voltages. The interface can make use of a Universal Serial Bus (USB) connection.

Dedicated software (CAT programs) allows a radio to be controlled through the PC. Changes made on the radio through user interactions on the CAT program such as frequency adjustments or mode changes are generally shown on the PC's screen. Using appropriate software, memories in transceivers that store frequence and mode information can also be programmed through a CAT interface. On menu-controlled radios a CAT interface can also be used to access and manipulate menu and sub-menu items.

The functionality of CAT equipment (software & interface) depends on the radio and the features included in the CAT software. As a rule, more modern radios do have more CAT functionality.

Logging programs that support CAT operation may benefit of the CAT system providing information from the radio relevant to the contact, such as frequency and mode.

CAT interfaces and programs are used to remotely control frequency and modes of a radio, not to receive or transmit any over-the-air signals. For data mode operations there exist dedicated interfaces. However, it is possible to access the CAT interface through a data mode program, such that the interface is shared by both programs.

== See also ==
- Serial port
