= Katz (surname) =

Katz is a common German and Ashkenazi Jewish surname.

Germans with the last name Katz may originate in the Rhine River region of Germany, where the Katz Castle is located. (The name of the castle does not derive from Katze, "cat", but from Katzenelnbogen, going back to Latin Cattimelibocus, consisting of the ancient Germanic tribal names of the Chatti and Melibokus.)

Where it is a Jewish surname, Katz is almost always a Hebrew abbreviation (Hebrew: כּ״ץ, Kaf (a) Tzaddi, or Ka-Tz) formed from the initials of the term Kohen Tzedek ("priest of justice", "authentic priest"), indicating descent from Jewish priests (although not all Jewish Katzes are in fact descended from priests).

The full form Kohen Tzedek appears as a surname or title in a number of medieval sources, while the acronym Katz has been used since the seventeenth century, or perhaps somewhat earlier. If the reading is correct, this abbreviation occurs on a tombstone, dated 1536, in the cemetery of Prague. It is found also on a tombstone of the year 1618 in Frankfurt, in the books of the Soncino family of Prague of the seventeenth century, and in one of the prefaces to Shabbethai ben Meïr ha-Kohen's notes on the Choshen Mishpat (Amsterdam, 1663).

The use of the abbreviated and Germanicized Katz likely coincided with the imposition of German names on Jews in Germany in the 18th and 19th centuries. Jews with the surname Katzenelenbogen may also have shortened their surname to Katz upon arrival in America.

Notable people with the surname include:

- Aaron Katz (Soviet general) (1901-1971)
- Abraham Katz (1926–2013), American diplomat
- Ada Katz (born 1928), American artist's model
- Adam Katz, American sports agent
- Albert Katz (1858–1923), writer
- Alex Katz (born 1927), American artist
- Alex Katz (baseball) (born 1994), American baseball player
- Allan Katz (born 1941), American comedy writer
- Allan J. Katz (born 1947), American ambassador
- Amir Katz (born 1973), Israeli-born musician
- Andrew Katz, drummer of Car Seat Headrest
- Andy Katz (born 1968), American college basketball journalist
- Bernard Katz (1911–2003), German-born British biophysicist
- Boris Katz (born 1947), American computer scientist
- Burt Katz (1937–2016), American restaurateur
- Charles Katz (1927–1974), American mathematician and computer scientist
- Dan Katz (disambiguation), multiple people
- Daniel Katz (disambiguation), multiple people
- Danny Katz (born 1963), Australian columnist and author
- Daryl Katz (born 1961), Canadian drug store owner, owner of Edmonton Oilers
- Dave Katz (disambiguation), multiple people
- David Katz (disambiguation), multiple people
- Dill Katz (1946–2025), British bassist and educator
- Dovid Katz (born 1956), Lithuanian-American Yiddishist and academic
- Elias Katz (1901–1947) , Finnish 3,000-meter steeplechase runner
- Elie Katz (born 1974), American politician from New Jersey
- Elihu Katz (1926–2021), American-Israeli sociologist and communication scientist
- Emmanuel Mané-Katz (1894–1962), Ukraine-born Israeli artist
- Erez Katz (born 1980), Israeli basketball player
- Erich Katz (1900–1973), German-born musicologist and Jewish refugee
- Ethan Katz (born 1983), American Major League Baseball pitching coach
- Gary Katz, American music producer
- Greg Katz, guitarist and lead vocalist of Cheekface
- Haim Katz (born 1947), Israeli politician
- Harold Katz (1937–2025), American entrepreneur
- Harold A. Katz (1921–2012), American lawyer and politician
- Ian Katz (born 1968), British journalist
- Israel Katz (born 1955), Israeli politician
- Iwan Katz (1889–1956), German politician
- Jack Katz (disambiguation), multiple people
- Jackson Katz (born 1960), gender violence educator
- Jacob Katz (1904–1998), Israeli historian
- Jane Katz (born 1943), American swimmer and author
- Jane Lobman Katz (1931–1986), American activist
- Jay Katz (disambiguation), multiple people
- Jeff Katz (disambiguation), multiple people
- Jeffry Katz, American music producer
- Jerrold Katz, American philosopher and linguist
- Joanne Katz, American professor
- Joel D. Katz, Canadian psychologist and researcher
- Joette Katz (born 1953), American attorney
- Jon Katz (born 1947), American journalist and writer
- Jonathan Katz (born 1946), American comedian, actor, and voice actor
- Jonathan David Katz (born 1958), American professor
- Jonathan Ned Katz (born 1938), American historian of LGBT American history
- Jordan Katz, American trumpeter
- Joseph Katz (disambiguation), multiple people
- Josh Katz (born 1997), Australian Olympic judoka
- Josie Katz (born 1940), Israeli singer
- Judah Katz, Canadian actor
- Katriel Katz (1908–1988), Israeli diplomat
- Lawrence F. Katz (born 1959), American economist
- Leslie Rachel Katz (born 1961), American attorney and politician
- Louise Katz, Australian writer of fantasy and young adult fiction
- Leo Katz (disambiguation), multiple people
- Leon Katz (disambiguation), multiple people
- Liz Katz, American cosplayer and actress
- Mabel Katz, Argentinian-American speaker and TV show host
- Martin Katz (disambiguation), multiple people
- Maxim Katz, Russian politician and activist
- Melinda Katz (born 1965), American Queens County District Attorney, 19th Borough President of Queens,Member of the New York State Assembly
- Mickey Katz (1909–1985), American comedian and musician
- Mike Katz (born 1944), American bodybuilder
- Mikhail Katz (born 1958), Israeli mathematician and professor
- Miriam Katz (born 1931), birth name of Miriam Zohar, Israeli actress
- Nathan Katz (disambiguation), multiple people
- Nets Katz, mathematician
- Nicholas Katz (born 1943), American mathematician
- Omri Katz (born 1976), American-Israeli actor
- Otto Katz, agent of the Soviet Union
- Paul Katz, American cellist
- Phil Katz, American computer programmer
- Phoebe Cates (born Phoebe Belle Katz), American actress
- Ralph Katz, American bridge player
- Randy H. Katz, American professor
- Raphael Katz, American politician
- Renina Katz (1925–2025), Brazilian engraver, printmaker, and watercolorist
- Richard H. Katz, American bridge player
- Rita Katz, terrorism analyst
- Robert Katz (1933–2010), American novelist, screenwriter, and non-fiction author
- Ron Katz (born 1985), Israeli politician
- Ronald A. Katz (1936–2025), American inventor
- Rudolf Katz (1895–1961), German judge and politician
- Ryan Katz (born 1976), American wrestler
- Sam Katz, Canadian politician from Manitoba
- Samuel Katz (disambiguation), multiple people
- Sandor Katz (born 1962), American DIY writer and food activist
- Sheila Moriber Katz (1943–2023), American pathologist
- Sheldon Katz (born 1956), American mathematician
- Shmuel Katz (artist) (1926–2010), Israeli artist
- Sidney A. Katz, American mayor of Gaithersburg, Maryland
- Simon Katz (born 1971), English songwriter and musician
- Steve Katz (disambiguation), multiple people
- Sky Katz, American rapper and actress
- Tamar Katz (born 1988), Israeli figure skater living in the US
- Tuvia Katz (born 1936), Israeli artist
- Vera Katz (1933–2017), American politician
- Victor J. Katz (born 1942), American mathematician and historian of mathematics
- Welwyn Wilton Katz, Canadian children's author
- William Loren Katz (1927–2019), American historian, specializing in African American history
- Yossi Katz (born 1949), Israeli politician
- Yossi Katz (geographer) (born 1953), Israeli political geographer

== Fictional characters ==
- Military chaplain Otto Katz from The Good Soldier Švejk

== See also ==
- Kats (surname)
- Katz (disambiguation)
- Katz forms: Kaz, Catz, Cats, Katzy
- Cats (surname)
