= Cats (disambiguation) =

Cats are small domesticated mammals of the Felis catus species.

Cats may also refer to:

- The cats, common name for Felidae, the biological family of the big cats, including lions, tigers, pumas, leopards and wildcats
- Cats (surname)

== Entertainment and media ==
- Cats (musical), a 1981 Andrew Lloyd Webber musical
  - Cats (1998 film), a video version of the musical
  - Cats (2019 film), a film based on the musical
- Cats (1925 film), a 1925 silent British comedy film
- Cats (2018 film), an animated Chinese film
- "Cats", an episode of the television series Zoboomafoo
- "Cats", by Mitski from her album Nothing's About to Happen to Me, 2026
- Housecats (film), an Academy Award winning animated short film

== Sports ==
- Geelong Cats, an Australian football league team
- The former name of the Lions rugby team in South Africa
- Kilkenny GAA teams (County Kilkenny, Ireland)

== Acronyms and abbreviations ==
CATS or C.A.T.S. may stand for:

=== Arts and entertainment ===
- Critics' Awards for Theatre in Scotland, an annual awards event in Scotland
- C.A.T.S., fictional Home Office team from C.A.T.S. Eyes, a British television series aired between 1985 and 1987
- CATS, a character from the 1989 video game Zero Wing known for speaking the phrase "All your base are belong to us"
- Crash Arena Turbo Stars, an online multiplayer video game

=== Education ===
- Commonwealth Accountability Testing System, the assessment process for K-12 schools in Kentucky, United States
- Credit Accumulation and Transfer Scheme, a scheme used by many UK universities to evaluate modular degrees

=== Science, medicine and technology ===
- CATS (astronomy), Categorizing Atmospheric Technosignatures, listing related to the atmospheres of astronomical bodies.
- CATS (software), electronic design automation software
- Children's Acute Transport Service, UK Children's Intensive Care Transport Service (publicly funded)
- Cloud Aerosol Transport System, a meteorological instrument on the International Space Station
- Cognitive analytic therapy, a psychological therapy initially developed in the United Kingdom
- Computer Active Technology Suspension, an automotive technology that controls the movement of the wheels

=== Transport ===
- CATS pipeline, a natural gas pipeline in the North Sea
- Canadian American Transportation Systems, a defunct Fast Ferry company serving Rochester, New York and Toronto, Ontario
- Capital Area Transit System, a transit system in Baton Rouge, Louisiana
- Charlotte Area Transit System, the regional transit authority for metropolitan Charlotte, North Carolina, United States
- Chicago Area Transportation Study, the former metropolitan planning organization for the Chicago region
- Children's Acute Transport Service, UK Children's Intensive Care Transport Service (publicly funded)
- City of Anderson Transit System, a transit agency in Anderson, Indiana

=== Other uses ===
- CATS (trading system), Computer Assisted Trading System, an automated trading system developed by the Toronto Stock Exchange
- Central Autónoma de Trabajadores Salvadoreños, a trade union in El Salvador
- Citizens for an Alternative Tax System, a national tax reform public interest group in the United States (1990–2005)

== See also ==
- Cat (disambiguation)
- The Cats (disambiguation)
- Kats (disambiguation)
- Katz (disambiguation)
