= Kats =

Kats or KATS may refer to:

- KATS, a radio station (94.5 FM) licensed to Yakima, Washington, USA
- Kats, Netherlands, a town in the Dutch province of Zeeland
- The Kats, a 1970s American band
- Kingsport Area Transit System (KATS)
- Korean Agency for Technology and Standards
- Kats, Armenia, now known as Astghadzor
- Artesia Municipal Airport (ICAO: KATS), New Mexico, USA
- Nashville Kats, an Arena Football League team
- Kats (surname)

== See also ==
- Cat (disambiguation)
- Kat (disambiguation)
- Katz (disambiguation), including the surname
- Katsu (disambiguation)
