= NETC =

NETC may refer to:

- Naval Education and Training Command
- National Emergency Training Center
- Northeastern Technical College, netc.edu
- Net-C, French webmail
- Nebraska Educational Telecommunications Commission, operates the Nebraska Public Media
- Newport Naval Education/Training Center, at Naval Station Newport
- New England Theatre Conference, as mentioned at Kearsarge Arts Theatre Company and Ogunquit Playhouse
- North-East Transmission Company Limited, supported the ONGC Tripura Power Company, Palatana, Udaipur, Tripura, India
