= Katz =

Katz or KATZ may refer to:

== Fiction ==
- Katz Kobayashi, a character in Japanese anime
- "Katz", a 1947 Nelson Algren story in The Neon Wilderness
- Katz, a character in Courage the Cowardly Dog

== Other uses ==
- Katz (surname)
- Katz, British Columbia, an uninhabited official placename in Canada
  - Katz railway station, a Canadian Pacific Railway flag stop
- KATZ (AM), a radio station (1600 AM) licensed to St. Louis, Missouri, United States
- KATZ-FM, a radio station (100.3 FM) licensed to Bridgeton, Missouri
- 22981 Katz (1999 VN30), a main-belt asteroid
- Katz Editores, an independent Argentine scholarly publisher
- Katz syndrome, a rare congenital disorder
- Katz Castle, St. Goarshausen, Rhineland-Palatinate, Germany
- Katz Group of Companies, a Canadian retail pharmacy network
- Joseph M. Katz School of Business, a Graduate School at the University of Pittsburgh in Pennsylvania

== See also ==
- Cats (disambiguation)
- Kats (disambiguation)
- Katsu (Zen)
