= Agrégation =

Examination for civil service or in tertiary education in France

In France, the agrégation (French pronunciation: [aɡʁeɡasjɔ̃]) is the most competitive and prestigious examination in the French public education system. Successful candidates become professeurs agrégés (Note: ([pʁɔfesœʁ(z‿)aɡʁeʒe])) and are usually appointed as teachers in secondary schools or preparatory classes, or as lecturers in universities. There is also a separate agrégation in some disciplines of higher education, such as law, legal history, sciences, political science, economics, and management, called agrégation de l'enseignement supérieur, for required for some professorial positions.

== The civil service exam ==
=== Overview ===
Originating from the 18th century, the agrégation is a highly prestigious and competitive examination. The level of selectivity varies between disciplines: every year, the French Ministry of National Education determines and publishes a list of annual quotas for each discipline. There are about 300 to 400 positions open each year for mathematics, but usually fewer positions for humanities and social sciences (for example, 85 positions for philosophy were offered in 2024) and perhaps only one seat in some rarely taught foreign languages such as Japanese.

The agrégation is typically open only to holders of a five-year university diploma (master's degree) or above. There is also an internal agrégation for professeurs certifiés.

=== Selection process ===
The examination requires usually more than a year of preparation. Students of the écoles normales supérieures as well as graduate students who have just completed their master's degree often dedicate an entire year of their curriculum to prepare this examination, enrolling into specific graduate programs. Candidates are called agrégatifs.

The competitive exam generally consists first of a written part (admissibility), then an oral part (admission).

The jury is composed of university professors and "classes préparatoires" teachers.

=== Admissibility ===
The admissibility phase is composed of numerous writing tests, which consist of essays and analyses of documents. Each test takes up to 7 hours in duration, and the admissibility phase usually runs over an entire week.

Points obtained at each test are totaled, and candidates that meet the threshold set by the yearly quota are pronounced admissible by the jury. The writing part is when most candidates are eliminated.

=== Admission ===
The remaining candidates have to go through an oral part (admission), composed of different oral exams. In front of the jury, candidates must demonstrate their ability to prepare and give lectures on any topic within the scope of the discipline.

These lectures provide the opportunity to verify that the candidates possess the appropriate speaking skills and master the main exercises and components of their discipline; for example, in the Agrégation of Classics (French, Greek, Latin), candidates have to translate and comment on classical texts and texts from French literature. These lessons extend well above the secondary education level; the candidate may have to present a lesson appropriate for the second, third, or even fourth years of specialized courses at the university level. One reason is that the agrégés should be able to teach in preparatory classes, very similar in nature to grammar schools, or in universities.

Points obtained at the admissibility and admission phases are ultimately totaled and used to rank candidates in accordance with the yearly quota: for instance, for a quota of 60 positions, the first 60 candidates will pass the exam and are pronounced admis by the jury.

The agrégation is therefore used as an unofficial national ranking system for students, giving a fair comparison between candidates of different universities. That is especially true in the humanities and social sciences, for which the agrégation is highly selective and supposedly demonstrates erudition of the candidate.

=== Professional outcomes ===
In France, professeurs agrégés are distinguished from professeurs certifiés, recruited through the CAPES, the other main competitive exam in the French education system. The agrégés receive a higher salary and are usually endorsed with a smaller teaching service. While agrégés are expected to teach in sixth-form colleges (lycées) and universities and the certifiés in secondary schools (collèges), there is a significant overlap.

In addition to the vast majority of agrégés teaching in sixth-form colleges and secondary schools, some agrégés teach in the preparatory classes for the grandes écoles, or at the university level, through a faculty position known as PRAG and focused on teaching, which does not require to undertake scientific research, as other university academics do. A few positions that include research activities, called agrégé préparateur, or AGPR, exist in the écoles normales supérieures.

=== List of agrégations ===
Foreign Languages

- Agrégation d'allemand (Agrégation of German language)
- Agrégation d'anglais (Agrégation of English language)
- Agrégation d'arabe (Agrégation of Arabic language)
- Agrégation de chinois (Agrégation of Chinese language)
- Agrégation d'espagnol (Agrégation of Spanish language)
- Agrégation d'hébreu moderne (Agrégation of Hebrew language)
- Agrégation d'italien (Agrégation of Italian language)
- Agrégation de japonais (Agrégation of Japanese language)
- Agrégation de polonais (Agrégation of Polish language)
- Agrégation de russe (Agrégation of Russian language)
- Agrégation de portugais (Agrégation of Portuguese language)

Humanities

- Agrégation d'histoire (Agrégation of history)
- Agrégation de géographie (Agrégation of geography)
- Agrégation de grammaire (Agrégation of grammar)
- Agrégation de lettres classiques (Agrégation of classics)
- Agrégation de lettres modernes (Agrégation of modern literature)
- Agrégation de philosophie (Agrégation of philosophy)

Economics and Social Sciences

- Agrégation de sciences économiques et sociales (Agrégation of economics and social sciences)
  - option histoire et géographie du monde contemporain (history and geography of modern world - from the industrial revolution)
  - option science politique et droit public (political science and public law)
- Agrégation d'économie/gestion (Agrégation of economics and management) :
  - option A : économie et gestion administrative,
  - option B : économie et gestion compatible et financière,
  - option C : économie et gestion commerciale,
  - option D : économie, informatique et gestion.

Although both Agrégations are labelled as Agrégation of economics, the Agrégation of economics and social sciences is more oriented towards political economy, whereas the Agrégation of economics and management is more oriented towards business economics.

Physical and Natural Sciences

- Agrégation de mathématiques (Agrégation of mathematics)
  - option A : probabilités et statistiques
  - option B : calcul scientifique
  - option C : algèbre et calcul formel
  - option D : informatique théorique (does not exist anymore since the creation of Agrégation d'informatique)
- Agrégation de sciences de la vie - sciences de la Terre et de l'Univers (Agrégation of biology-geology)
- Agrégation de sciences physiques (Agrégation of physics-chemistry)
  - option physique
  - option chimie
  - option physique appliquée
  - option procédés physico-chimiques
- Agrégation d'informatique (Agrégation of computer science) which was created in 2022

Technical and Vocational Education

- Agrégation de biochimie - génie biologique (Agrégation of biochemistry - biology)
- Agrégation de génie civil (Agrégation of civil engineering)
- Agrégation de génie mécanique (Agrégation of mechanical engineering)
- Agrégation de génie électrique (Agrégation of electrical engineering)
- Agrégation de génie informatique (Agrégation of informatical engineering)
- Agrégation de mécanique (Agrégation of mechanics)

Art

- Agrégation d'arts (Agrégation of arts)
  - option arts plastiques (Agrégation of visual arts)
  - option arts appliqués (Agrégation of applied arts)
  - option histoire des arts (Agrégation of arts' history)
- Agrégation de musique (Agrégation of music)

Physical Education

- Agrégation d'éducation physique et sportive (Agrégation of physical education and sports)

== In tertiary education ==
=== Overview ===
In some disciplines of higher education such as law, legal history, political science, economics, and management, there exists an agrégation for the professorship positions, called agrégation de l'enseignement supérieur. In this competitive exam, the candidate also has to give several lessons in front of a committee.

=== Process ===
Usually there are three lessons, spread over several months, except in economics, where there are only two lessons. The first and the last lessons have to be prepared alone, during eight hours, in a library of basic titles selected by the committee. For the remaining lesson, when it exists, the candidate has a full 24 hours to prepare for the examination, and may use several libraries as well as a team of "helpers" (usually doctoral candidates or fellow candidates, but never full professors).

=== Types ===
- Agrégation de droit (Agrégation of law)
  - Agrégation de droit privé (Agrégation of private law)
  - Agrégation de droit public (Agrégation of public law)
  - Agrégation d'histoire du droit (Agrégation of legal history)
- Agrégation de science politique (Agrégation of political science)
- Agrégation d'économie (Agrégation of economics; not to be confused with the agrégations for secondary education that are the agrégation de sciences économiques et sociales and the agrégation d'économie et de gestion)
- Agrégation de gestion (Agrégation of management; not to be confused with the agrégation for secondary education that is the agrégation d'économie et de gestion)

=== Some notable agrégés ===
- Philosophers: Alain Badiou (philosophy), Henri Bergson (philosophy), Jean-Paul Sartre (philosophy), Simone de Beauvoir (philosophy), Raymond Aron (philosophy), Michel Foucault (philosophy) Jacques Derrida (philosophy), André Glucksmann (philosophy), Alain Finkielkraut (Modern Letters), Luc Ferry (philosophy), Louis Althusser (philosophy), Simone Weil (philosophy), André Comte-Sponville (philosophy), Jean-François Lyotard (Philosophy), Catherine Malabou (philosophy)
- Anthropologists: Claude Lévi-Strauss (philosophy)
- Politicians: Jean Jaurès (philosophy), Georges Pompidou (Letters), Alain Juppé (Agrégation in Classics), Jacques Legendre (Agrégation in History and Geography), Laurent Fabius (lettres modernes), Marisol Touraine (Agrégation in Economics and Social Science), Bruno Le Maire (Modern Letters), Aurélie Filippetti (Classics), Laurent Wauquiez (History), François Bayrou (Classics), Xavier Darcos (Classics)
- Writers: Jean-Paul de Dadelsen (agrégé in German), translator of Nathan Katz among others., Jacques Delille, translator of Virgil, Julien Gracq (Agrégation in History and Geography), aka: Louis Poirier, Jules Romains aka: Louis Farigoule (philosophie), Daniel-Rops (histoire-géographie) aka: Henri Petiot, Henri Queffélec (lettres), Jean-Louis Curtis (English), Patrick Grainville (Agrégation in Modern Letters), Dominique Fernandez (Agrégation in Italian), Danielle Sallenave (letters)
- Historians: Patrick Boucheron, Emmanuel Le Roy Ladurie, Pierre Nora, Pierre Vidal-Naquet, Michelle Perrot
- Sociologists: Pierre Bourdieu (philosophy), Émile Durkheim (philosophy)
- Economists: Esther Duflo, recipient of the Nobel Memorial Prize in Economic Sciences; Emmanuel Farhi, Daniel Cohen
- Hellenists: Jacqueline de Romilly (Classics), linguist Georges Dumézil (Classics)
- Mathematicians: Cédric Villani, recipient of the Fields Medal; Hugo Duminil-Copin, recipient of the Fields Medal
- Physicists: Pierre-Gilles de Gennes, recipient of Nobel Prize in Physics; Philippe Nozières; Francis Halzen, recipient of the 2026 Nobel Prize in Physics

== In popular culture ==
In the 1988 movie L'Étudiante, a dramatic scene features Sophie Marceau undertaking the oral exam for the agrégation of Classic Literature.

In the TV show The Bureau, Paul Lefebvre, one of the aliases of French spy Guillaume Debailly, played by Mathieu Kassovitz, holds the agrégation of Modern Literature.

== See also ==
- Habilitation, the highest university degree in some European and other non-English-speaking countries
