= Kat =

Kat or KAT may refer to:

== People ==
- Karl-Anthony Towns (born 1995), American basketball player
- Kat Abughazaleh (born 1999), journalist, social media influencer, candidate for Illinois's 9th congressional district in the 2026 U.S. House elections
- Kat Alano (born 1985), Anglo-Filipino model, actress, and television presenter/VJ in the Philippines
- Kat Ashley (c1502–1565), governess to Queen Elizabeth I
- Kat Bjelland (born 1963), American musician
- Kat Blaque (born 1990), American YouTuber, activist, and artist
- Kat Cammack (born 1988), American politician
- Kat Chua (born 1992), Filipino politician
- Kat Cressida (born 1968), American actress
- Kat DeLuna (born 1987), singer-songwriter
- Kat Dennings, stage name of American actress Katherine Victoria Litwack (born 1986)
- Kat Foster (born 1978), American actress
- Kat Graham (born 1989), American actress, singer, songwriter, record producer, dancer, and model
- Kat La, real life name for ItsFunneh, member of YouTube group Krew.
- Kat Leyh, American comics writer and artist
- Kat Stewart (born 1972), Australian actress
- Kat Swift (fl. 2008), American politician and activist
- Kat Von D (born 1982), tattoo artist
- The Great Kat, metal guitarist and violinist
- The Kat, stage name of Stacy Carter (born 1970), former professional wrestling personality

== Fictional characters ==
- Kat, a pilot in the 2004 Battlestar Galactica TV series
- Kat (Gravity Rush), the protagonist of the video game Gravity Rush
- Kat, the head of the Department of Extra-Normal Operations (DENO) in the comic book series MPH
- Kat, a cybernetic alien in the Canadian animated TV series Kid vs. Kat
- Kat, a recurring character in the Disney Channel TV show The Ghost and Molly McGee
- Kat, a character from the WarioWare series
- Catherine-B320 (nicknamed Kat), a non-player character in the Halo: Reach video game
- Karate Kat, the main character of the same-named cartoon TV series
- Krazy Kat, an American comic strip character
- DJ Kat, the main character in the puppet children's TV series The DJ Kat Show
- Kats, anthropomorphic cats in the cartoon series SWAT Kats: The Radical Squadron
- Kat Harvey, from the movie Casper
- Kat Hillard, from the Power Rangers TV series
- Kat Jennings, a character from The Final Destination franchise
- Doctor Katherine "Kat" Manx, from the Power Rangers TV series
- Kat Ryan, a supporting character in the Max Steel franchise
- Kat Slater, from the BBC soap opera EastEnders
- Kat Stratford, from the movie 10 Things I Hate About You

== Places ==
- Kat, Kohgiluyeh and Boyer-Ahmad, Iran
- Kat, Mazandaran, Iran
- Kat, Razavi Khorasan, Iran
- Kąt, Stalowa Wola County, Poland
- Kąt, Tarnobrzeg County, Poland

== Transportation ==
- KAT metro station, a train station in Kifissia, Greece
- Kai Tak station (MTR station code: KAT), Hong Kong
- Kaitaia Airport (IATA: KAT), New Zealand
- Karet railway station, a former railway station in Central Jakarta, Indonesia
- Kato Airline (ICAO: KAT), a defunct Norwegian airline
- Knoxville Area Transit, the operator of public transportation in Knoxville, Tennessee, U.S.

== Other uses ==
- Kat (band), a Polish heavy metal music group
- KATS, an FM radio station licensed to Yakima, Washington
- Kat, a cultivar of Karuka
- Kat, floor in Turkish postal addresses
- Katal (symbol: kat), the SI unit of measurement for catalytic activity
- Acetyl-CoA C-acyltransferase, an enzyme
- Kearsarge Arts Theatre Company, a non-profit summer program for children interested in the arts
- KickassTorrents, also known as KAT, a BitTorrent search engine
- Kleene algebra with tests
- Team Katusha (ICU code KAT), a Russian bicycle racing team

== See also ==
- Kat O, an island in northeast Hong Kong territory
- De Kat (disambiguation)
- Cat (disambiguation)
- Kats (disambiguation)
- Khat, a plant
