= Nathan Katz =

Nathan Katz may refer to:

- Nathan Katz (professor) (born 1948), Jewish American professor at Florida International University, specialising in Indian Jewish communities
- Nathan Katz (poet) (1892–1981), Jewish Alsatian poet
- Nathan Katz (judoka) (born 1995), Australian judoka

== See also ==
- Katz (name)
