= Kazu =

Kazu is a Japanese given name for both sexes. Notable people with the name include:

- Princess Kazu (和宮 親子内親王; 1846–1877), wife of 14th shōgun Tokugawa Iemochi
- Kazu Ando (安藤 和津, born 1948), Japanese essayist
- Kazu Fujimura (藤村 佳津; born 1955), Japanese swimmer
- Kazu Hatanaka (畑中 和), Japanese Paralympic athlete
- Kazu Hiro (born 1969), American prosthetic makeup artist
- Kazu Kibuishi (born 1978), American graphic novelist
- Kazu Makino (カズ 牧野), member of the band Blonde Redhead
- Kazu Miura (三浦 知良; born 1967), Japanese footballer, often called King Kazu
- Kazu Naoki (直木 和; 1918–1940s), Japanese footballer
- Gabriel Kazu, (born 1999) Brazilian footballer
- Christian Kendji Wagatsuma Ferreira, (born 2000) Brazilian footballer, commonly known as Kazu

== Fictional characters ==
- Kazu Minamoto (皆本 カズ), in the anime series Doraemon
- Kazu Sakura (咲良和), in the anime series You and Idol Pretty Cure
- Kazu of the Heavenly Time Star (天時星・知, Tenjisei Kazu), in the Japanese TV series Gosei Sentai Dairanger

== Other uses ==
- KAZU, radio station in Pacific Grove, California, US

== See also ==
- Kaz (disambiguation)
