= Agrégation de Lettres classiques =

Higher-level French competitive examination in Classical studies

The Agrégation de Lettres classiques (Classics) and its peer, the Agrégation de Grammaire, are higher-level French competitive examinations held to recruit, in principle, senior secondary school teachers – though many of its laureates are in fact university teachers, whether lecturers or professors.

The Agrégation examination is national in scope and is thus not tied to any particular university or institution. Laureates, called agrégés (in this case, agrégés de Lettres Classiques or agrégés de Grammaire), become civil servants, like other teachers within the Ministère de l'Éducation nationale. Being an agrégé is a de facto condition for doctors who want to get tenure as university lecturers (maîtres de conférence).

Each year, there is a definite number of positions offered for each discipline separately, on a nationwide level, with slight variation from year to year. In 2013, for example, Lettres Classiques had 75 posts, while Grammaire had 10.

These examinations require great mastery of Latin, Ancient Greek, and French (including Medieval French). Every year, a set of about 14 book-length classical texts is assigned as the program to be studied in particular (see example below for year 2012-2013).

== History ==
Upon its creation in 1766, the Agrégation included “Grammaire” and “Belles Lettres” amongst its sections, along with “Philosophie”.

Until 1946, the competition remained a purely Classical examination. The Grammaire competition was a mixture mainly of Classics, but also of studies in historical linguistics and Indo-European reconstruction. A proportion of medieval and modern French literature was then added (slightly greater in Lettres Classiques than in Grammaire) making it virtually impossible for outsiders to succeed in the competition. The opening of these competitions to European citizens has had insignificant practical outcome.

== Preparation ==
In order to be allowed to sit the Agrégation examination, one must have obtained an MA degree and register for the agrégation exam at the Ministère de l'Éducation nationale. Universities specialising in humanities, but also other institutions like the École Normale Supérieure, offer a specific preparation course for the Agrégation de Lettres classiques. This special year is distinct from the LMD cursus; it is not linked to the examination itself. It is common for students reading for an MA degree to follow some lessons – general lessons about grammar, unseen translation and prose composition in Latin and Ancient Greek, but also the lessons about the texts that will still be in the program the following year, when they sit the examination.

Each year, the prescribed texts in literature are totally renewed, and half the ones in Ancient Greek and Latin are changed. By two years, every text is therefore changed.

The detailed specifics of the course vary from a preparation center to the other. The agrégatifs (candidates) follow a certain number of lectures about each author in the program, during which they are trained in the examination exercises; they also train for the Ancient Greek and Latin translation exercises, as well as for the dissertation française. They can follow the same lessons as the agrégatifs of Lettres modernes in what regards the French texts.

The preparation, as well as the examination itself, remain very academic in nature; it has been criticised for selecting people who fit in a certain profile that is expected by the board rather than hiring people with an original approach on the subject. However, unlike the research work done when reading for an MA or PhD degree, the agrégation does not require a scholarly approach of the works. It is therefore not required to read extensively critical work on the authors (and some professors even warn their students not to) or engage in academic research about them; the board of examinators expects the agrégatif to have above all a great personal knowledge of the text, irrigated by the reading of the foremost critics.

It is quite frequent for the agrégatifs to make three or so attempts in order to become an agrégé. However, these preparation years do not give (in most cases) ECTS. It is also possible to pass the Concours interne de Lettres classiques, when one has already the CAPES and has been teaching for several years; this examination differs from the concours externe in some ways.

== The examination ==
The examination follows a two-step process: first a set of five written tests (épreuves écrites); and two and a half months later, a series of oral interviews (épreuves orales).

The written examination lasts five days. One of the tests, the dissertation française is to be completed in seven hours. In order to concentrate on stylistic aspects, candidates are allowed to bring a range of dictionaries (e.g. Gaffiot and Bailly, amongst others) for the prose composition as well as unseen translation examinations.

Once the written tests have been marked, successful candidates are declared admissibles, i.e. qualified for the second round of interviews (with a ratio typically corresponding to about a half of the people who have taken the written exam). The interviews then take place in Paris, and last for about three weeks. There are five oral tests for the Classics agrégation, the longest one being the leçon, with 6h30 of preparation and 1h10 of presentation.

== Programs ==
The Greek and Latin texts chosen are of wider range than in most English-speaking universities. Philo of Alexandria and St. Ambrose have for example figured in recent years.

=== One example : the 2012-2013 session ===
French literature

- Medieval text: Guillaume de Lorris, Le Roman de la Rose.
- 16th century text: Maurice Scève, Délie.
- 17th century text: Madame de Sévigné, Lettres de l’année 1671.
- 18th century text: Rousseau, Les Confessions, books I to VI.
- 19th century text: Alfred de Musset, On ne badine pas avec l'amour, Il ne faut jurer de rien, Il faut qu’une porte soit ouverte ou fermée
- 20th century text: André Gide, Les Faux-Monnayeurs.

Classics

- Ancient Greek :
  - Apollonius of Rhodes, Argonautica III.
  - Sophocles, Oedipus at Colonus.
  - Xenophon, Symposium, Apology, Oeconomicus.
  - Plutarch, Life of Anthony (Parallel Lives).
- Latin :
  - Horace, Satires, I and II (1 to 3).
  - Seneca the Younger, Oedipus.
  - Tacitus, Annals, I and II.
  - Tertullian, De pallio, De spectaculis.

== The examination ==
=== Written exam : Épreuves d’admissibilité ===
| Test | Duration | Coefficient |
|---|---|---|
| 1. Latin prose composition | 4h00 | 6 |
| 2. Ancient Greek prose composition | 4h00 | 6 |
| 3. Latin (unseen) translation | 4h00 | 6 |
| 4. Ancient Greek (unseen) translation | 4h00 | 6 |
| 5. Dissertation française; about the texts in the program | 7h00 | 16 |

=== Oral exam : Épreuves d’admission ===
| Test | Preparation | Duration | Coefficient |
|---|---|---|---|
| 1. First part (15 points) : Leçon about the texts in the program; followed by an interview by the jury Second part : Agir en fonctionnaire de l’État (5 points) | 6h30 | 1h10 leçon : 0h40, Part 2 : 0h10 interview : 0h15 (leçon) et 0h10 (part 2) | 11 |
| 2. Literary analysis of a text in contemporary French from the texts; in the program (texts after 1500), followed by a grammar presentation on the text and by an interview. | 2h30 | 1h00 expl. & gram. : 0h45 entretien : 0h15 | 9 |
| 3. Literary analysis of a text in Medieval French from; the texts in the program (texts before 1500), followed by an interview. | 2h00 | 0h50 explication : 0h35 entretien : 0h15 | 5 |
| 4. Translation and literary analysis of a Latin text, followed by an interview. | 2h00 | 0h50 explication : 0h35 entretien : 0h15 | 8 |
| 5. Translation and literary analysis of an Ancient Greek text, followed by an interview. | 2h00 | 0h50 explication : 0h35 entretien : 0h15 | 8 |
