= Jean-Paul de Dadelsen =

French schoolmaster, journalist, broadcaster and poet (1913–1957)

- Born: 20 August 1913; Strasbourg, German Empire
- Died: 22 June 1957 (aged 43); Zürich, Switzerland
- Occupations: Journalist, poet, translator
- Years active: c. 1936–1957
- Known for: Poetry
- Notable work: "Jonah", "Bach en automne"

Jean-Paul de Dadelsen (20 August 1913 – 23 June 1957) was a French schoolmaster, officer, journalist, broadcaster and poet. He was an early supporter of a European Common Market and adviser to Jean Monnet.

== Biography ==
=== Youth ===
Jean-Paul de Dadelsen was born on 20 August 1913 Strasbourg. Despite the apparently noble patronymic, Jean-Paul de Dadelsen was the son of an Alsatian notary from Guebwiller, of German and Swiss ancestry. His mother came from Colmar. He spent his childhood, up to the age of 13, in the village of Mutterholz near Sélestat, where his father worked.

In 1927 the family moved to Hirsingue in the Department of Haut-Rhin. He attended the lycée at Mulhouse until 1929. He continued his secondary education at the JJ Henner college in Altkirch. Part of a group of artists, painters and writers, he encountered A. Schachemann, René Jourdain. Nathan Katz, Eugène Guillevic and pastor Hoffet.

After failing his Baccalauréat, his parents sent him to Paris as a boarder at the Lycée Louis-le-Grand. In 1930 while preparing his university entrance khâgne, he met L. Senghor and Georges Pompidou. He attended drawing classes with the Alsatian painter, Robert Breitwieser. He came top of his German course in the Agrégation of 1936 and was appointed schoolmaster at the Lycée Saint-Charles in Marseille. Between 1936 and 1939 he translated several German writers into French, among them: Hans Helfritz, Hermann von Keyserling, Bernard von Brentano.

=== War service ===
In 1938 he was called up as an army interpreter. In 1940 he fought in a tank regiment. He was awarded the Croix de Guerre. In 1941 he was appointed schoolmaster in Oran (Algeria) where he was befriended by Albert Camus.

In December 1942 he was posted to London with the Free French. He was appointed interpretation officer in several roles of the etat major of the 1st Parachute Brigade. In 1943 he became an officer of the Interior Commission, in the Information Section of de Gaulle's Provisional Government in London. That year he married an English woman, Barbara Windebank with whom he had two daughters.

In 1944, after the liberation of Paris, he was despatched to the capital as a deputy director in the Ministry of Information. In 1945 he joined the editorial staff of the newspaper, Combat, edited by Camus. Among its other leading contributors were Jean-Paul Sartre, André Malraux, Emmanuel Mounier and Raymond Aron.

=== Journalism ===
In 1946 he returned to London as special political correspondent for Combat. When Camus left Combat in 1947, de Dadelsen became London correspondent of the paper, Franc-Tireur, a post he filled 1948–1949. He had a son, Michel, by Elizabeth-Ann Heffernan (de Dadelsen), an actor.

Between 1946 and 1951 de Dadelsen presented, from London, a weekly current affairs programme, “Les Propos du Vendredi”, for the BBC French Section. He was an editor for both the BBC French and German services until 1956. In 1951 he moved to Geneva where he focused his career on Europe. He collaborated with Denis de Rougemont at the European Cultural Centre and became adviser to Jean Monnet and his European Coal and Steel Community in Luxembourg.

In 1956 he became deputy director of the International Press Institute in Zürich. Jean-Paul de Dadelsen died in Zürich on 23 June 1957 from a brain tumour.

== Poetic output ==
Not until the late age of 39, during his first stay in Switzerland, did de Dadelsen compose his first long poem, “Bach en automne” (1952–1953), that Camus published in 1955 in the Nouvelle Revue Française. In 1956 his “L'invocation luminaire de Jonas” and other poems appeared in the Cahiers des Saisons and in 1957, “La dernière nuit de la pharmacienne” and other poems were published in Preuves.

A first collection, consisting of the unfinished series, “Jonas”, was published by Gallimard in 1962 by François Duchêne, a colleague and friend of Jean Monnet. In the preface Henri Thomas said of the poet:

"He follows no one; he corresponds to nothing else in our Literature, neither dissidents nor rhetoricians will make their accounts with him. We always run the risk of forgetting that poetic genius flicks its thumb at our conformities.”

One of the sources of poetic inspiration for de Dadelsen, born in a practicing Lutheran family, was the Bible (see “Jonas”, “Bach en automne”, “La femme de Loth”). Alsace and the landscapes of his childhood, the Ried and the Sundgau moulded his poetic sensibilities and inform his output (“Jonas”, “Bach en automne”, "Goethe en Alsace", "Cinq étapes d’un poème"). He translated the Alsatian poems of Nathan Katz into French. As a German scholar he pays homage to Goethe and to Friedrich Schlegel.

His scripts for the BBC broadcasts on the theme of war (“Ombre”) and on Europe (“Strasbourg”, “acte de naissance”, “Y a-t-il une Europe?”, “La vocation de l’Angleterre”), just as his poem, “Les Ponts de Budapest”, on the Hungarian Revolution of 1956 against oppression by the USSR, speak to the destiny of Europe.

Although his early gifts were apparent to those around him, recognition of Jean-Paul de Dadelsen's poetic genius has only arrived posthumously. He wrote in French, in German (for the BBC) and in English ("Stone in Venice", "Prospect of Pisa").

== Memorials ==
- The village of Muttersholtz remembers him through its “de Dadelsen Trail”.
- The college in Hirsingue bears his name.

== Publications ==
- Jonas, Gallimard, 1962.
- Goethe en Alsace with commentary by Denis de Rougemont, François Mauriac and Baptiste-Marrey. Cognac, France: Le Temps qu'il fait, 1995.
- Jonas, Gallimard, « Poésie » 2005. In this edition 17 texts and poems are added to the body of the 1962 edition of "Jonas", taken from "Goethe en Alsace" edited by Baptiste-Marrey.
- La beauté de vivre. Poèmes et lettres à l'oncle Éric, preface by Gérard Pfister, with reminiscences from Nathan Katz, Erik Jung (the uncle in question) and Christian Lutz with a detailed biography and a complete bibliography, Éditions Arfuyen, 2013.

== Bibliography ==
- Jean-Paul Sorg, « Jean-Paul de Dadelsen », in Nouveau dictionnaire de biographie alsacienne, vol. 7, p. 565
- Albert Strickler, Lettre à Jean-Paul de Dadelsen : Pâques 1957-Pâques 2007, Les Petites Vagues éd., La Broque, 2007.
- Évelyne Frank, Jean-Paul de Dadelsen. La sagesse de l'en-bas, Éditions Arfuyen, préface de Jean-Claude Walter, 2013.
- Fonds Jean-Paul de Dadelsen, Œuvres en prose, carnets intimes, correspondance, documents biographiques, 1931-1957, Manuscripts of the "Bibliothèque nationale et universitaire de Strasbourg", Calames, 2015.
- Patrick Beurard-Valdoye (2019) Cycle des exils (VII) - Flache d’Europe aimants garde-fous, Flammarion ISBN 978-2081464582
