= Stephen M. Katz =

Stephen M. Katz may refer to:

- Steve Katz (politician), member of the New York State Assembly
- Stephen M. Katz (cinematographer), American cinematographer

== See also ==
- Steve Katz (disambiguation)
