= Muncie Indiana Transit System =

Public transit operator in Muncie, Indiana, U.S.

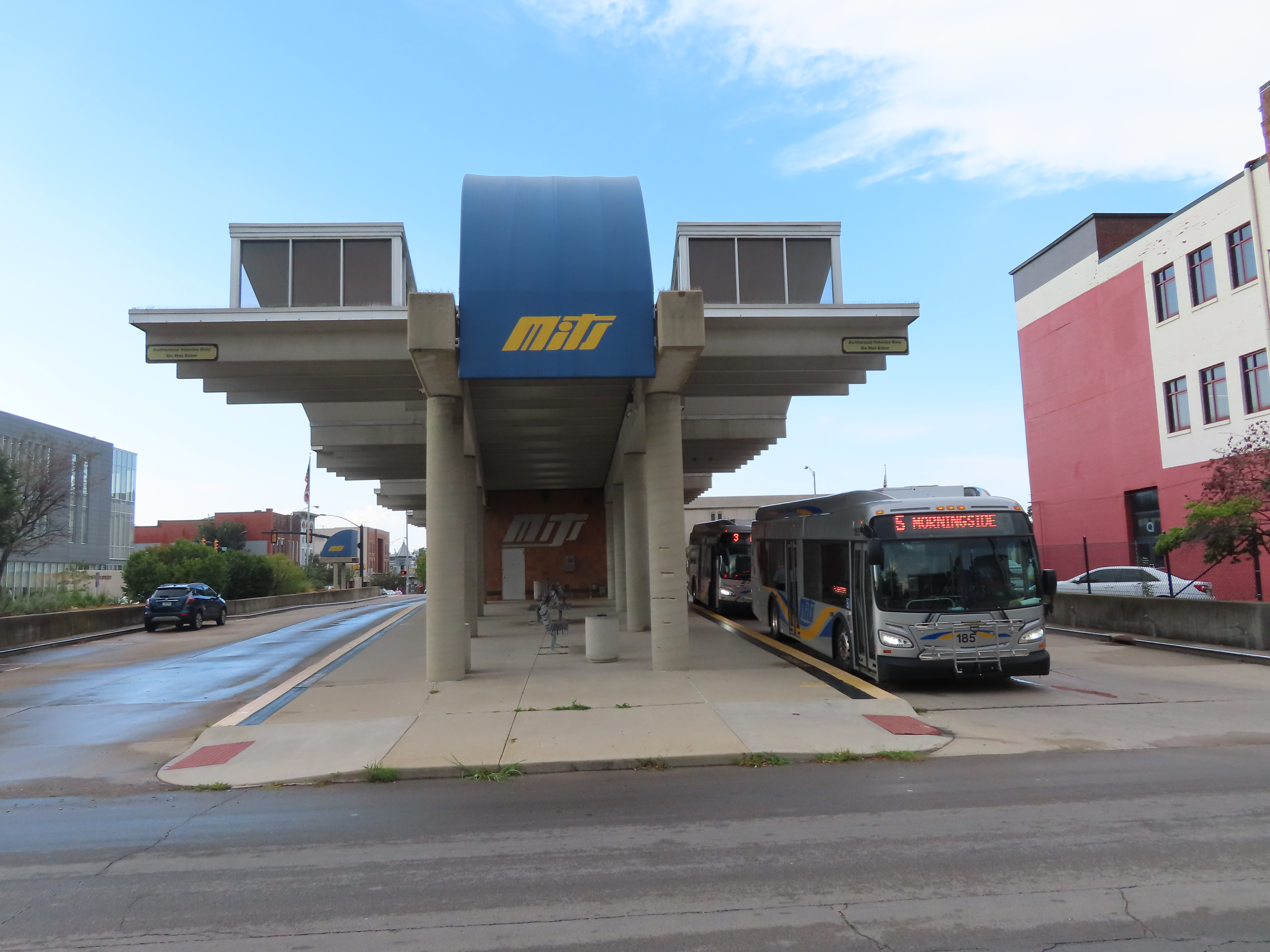
- Buses at the T.J. Ault III MITS Center in downtown Muncie
- Founded: 1981
- Headquarters: 1300 E Seymour St
- Locale: Muncie, Indiana
- Service type: bus service, paratransit
- Routes: 15
- Stations: 1
- Fleet: 30 Gillig BRT, 5 Gillig BRT Hybrids, 12 paratransit, 3 Gillig Trolleys, misc. GMC RTS and Flxible Metro
- Daily ridership: 3,200 (weekdays, Q1 2026)
- Annual ridership: 910,400 (2025)
- Fuel type: Biodiesel
- Website: mitsbus.org

Muncie Indiana Transit System (MITS) is the local bus service for Muncie, Indiana. MITS has 14 routes that originate in downtown Muncie and branch out about four miles in all directions. Some routes add buses during school hours to help shuttle students. MITSPlus vehicles are available upon request by disabled people who cannot use the mass-transit buses. In 2025, the system had a ridership of 910,400, or about 3,200 per weekday as of the first quarter of 2026.

== Awards ==
- MITS won the American Public Transportation Association's Outstanding Public Transit System Award in 2005 and 2008.
- American Public Transportation Association's Gold Award for Safety Award 2007.

== Fares ==
- Students, school faculty, and staff, and children under 12 (limit 3 per fare-paying passenger) ride for free.
- Senior citizens and disabled people pay a quarter to ride plus free transfers or $0.50 for a 24-hour pass.
- Adults pay $0.50, with free transfers, or $1 for a 24-hour pass.

== Routes ==
No.	Name	Notes
1	Ball State University	
2	Ball State Jackson	
3	Northwest Plaza	
4	Mall	
5	Whitely/Morningside	
6	North Walnut	
7	East Jackson	
8	Burlington	
9	Industry Willard	
10	Heekin Park	
11	Southway Center	
12	Ivy Tech	
14	Walmart North/Riverside	
16	Walmart North/University	
17	Justice Center	

== T.J. Ault III MITS Center ==
The T.J. Ault III MITS Center, located at 113 West Main Street, is the primary transfer point for MITS buses. The $1.1 million transit center opened September 14, 1987, alongside a weeklong fare-free bus promotion. The facility provides an indoor waiting area, restrooms, vending machines and a ticket counter.

== Fixed route ridership ==
The ridership statistics shown here are of fixed route services only and do not include demand response services.

== See also ==
- List of bus transit systems in the United States
- City of Anderson Transit System
