= Waldighofen =

Commune in Grand Est, France

Waldighofen Wàldighoffe
- Commune
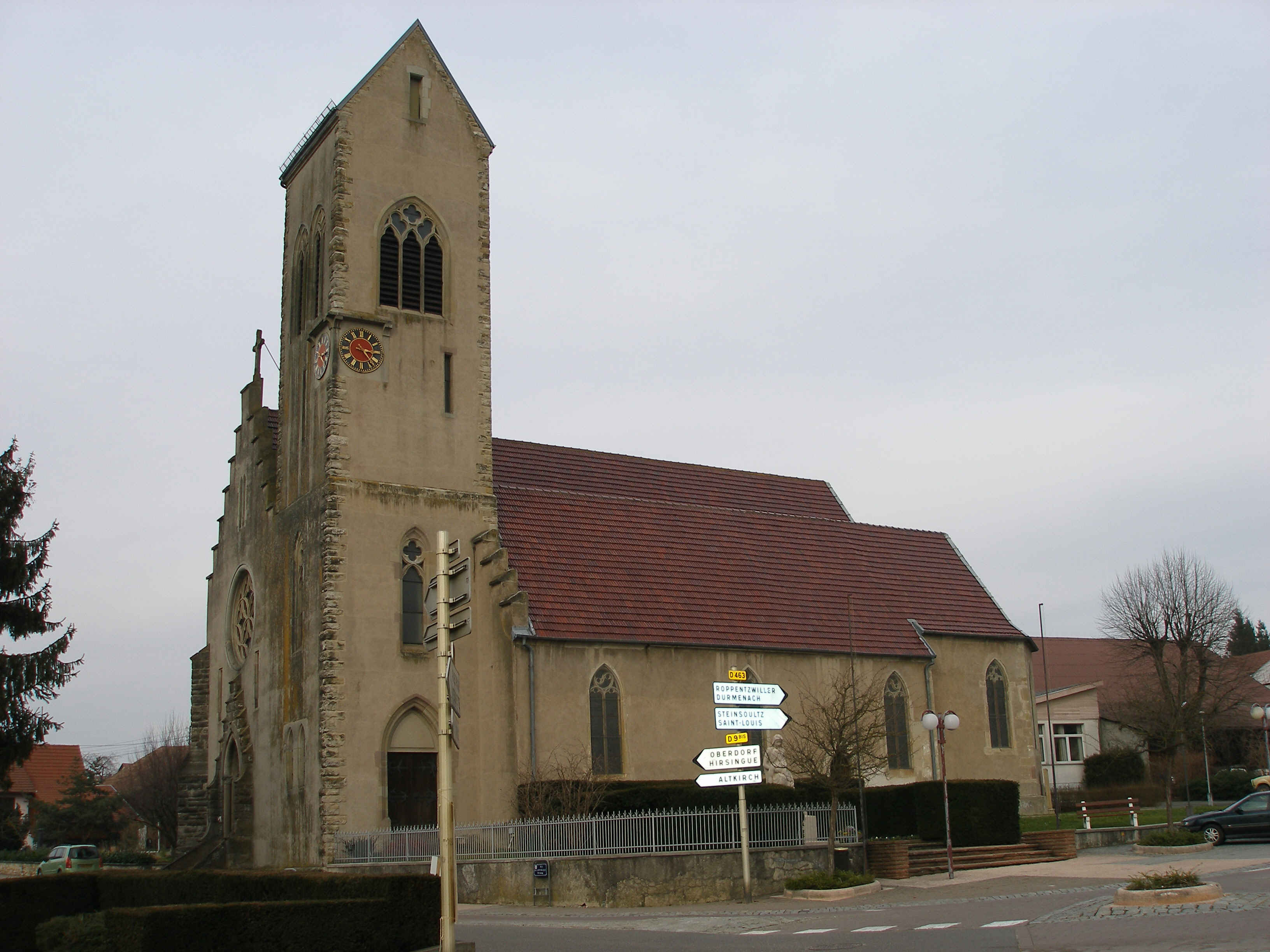
- Peter and Paul Church

- Coat of arms
- Location of Waldighofen
- Location within France Location within Grand Est
- Coordinates: 47°33′05″N 7°19′03″E
- Country: France
- Region: Grand Est
- Department: Haut-Rhin
- Arrondissement: Altkirch
- Canton: Altkirch
- Intercommunality: Sundgau

Government
  - Mayor (2021–2026): Jean-Claude Schielin
- Area^{1}: 4.14 km^{2} (1.60 sq mi)
- Elevation: 357 m (1,171 ft)
- Highest elevation: 446 m (1,463 ft)
- Lowest elevation: 342 m (1,122 ft)
- Population (2023): 1,558
  - Density: 376/km^{2} (975/sq mi)
- Time zone: UTC+01:00 (CET)
  - Summer (DST): UTC+02:00 (CEST)
- INSEE/Postal code: 68355 /68640
- ^{1} French Land Register data, which excludes lakes, ponds, glaciers > 1 km^{2} (0.386 sq mi or 247 acres) and river estuaries.

Waldighofen (French pronunciation: [valdiɡofən]; Alsatian: Wàldighoffe) is a commune in the Haut-Rhin department in Alsace in north-eastern France.

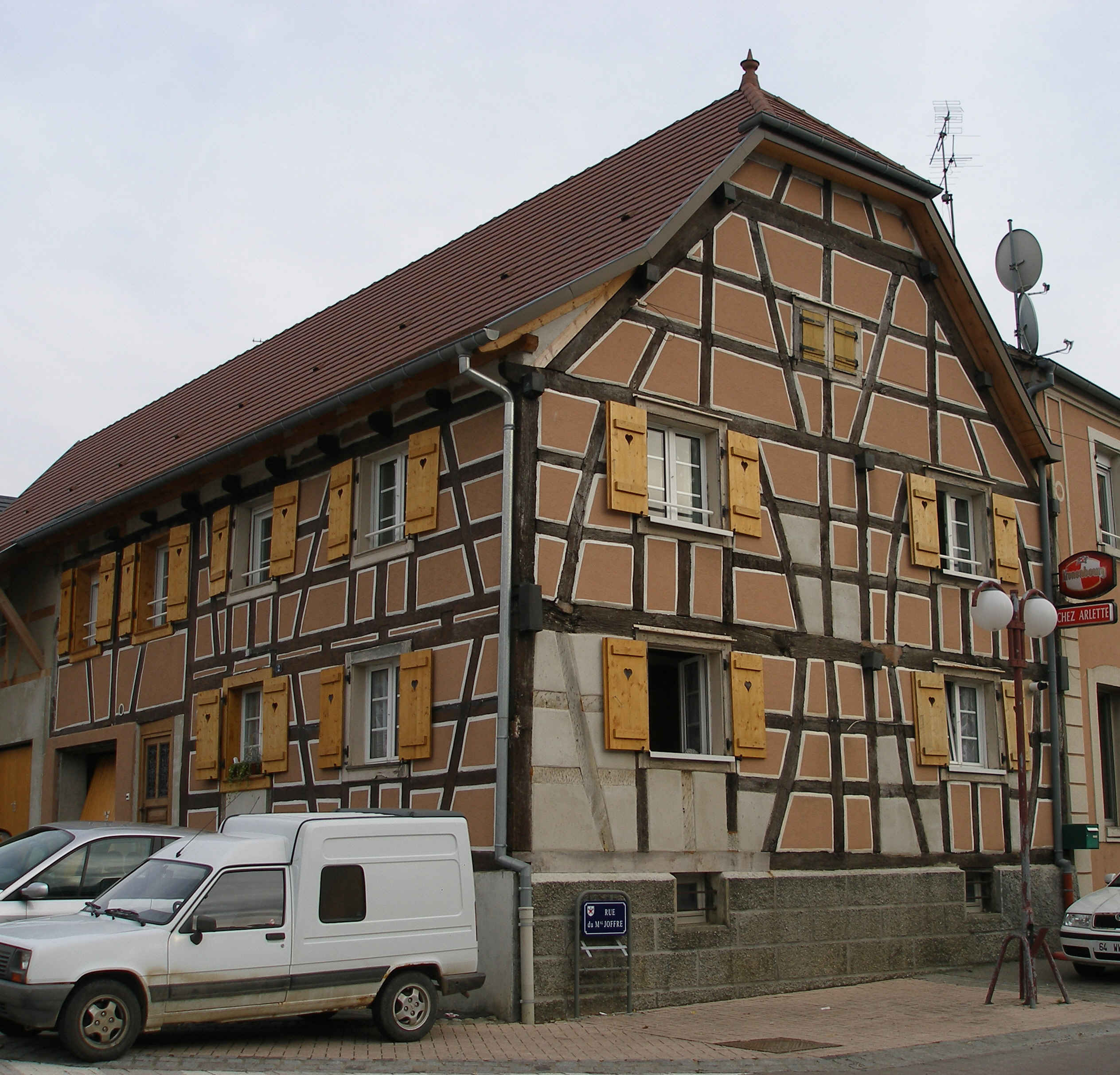
Birthplace of Nathan Katz

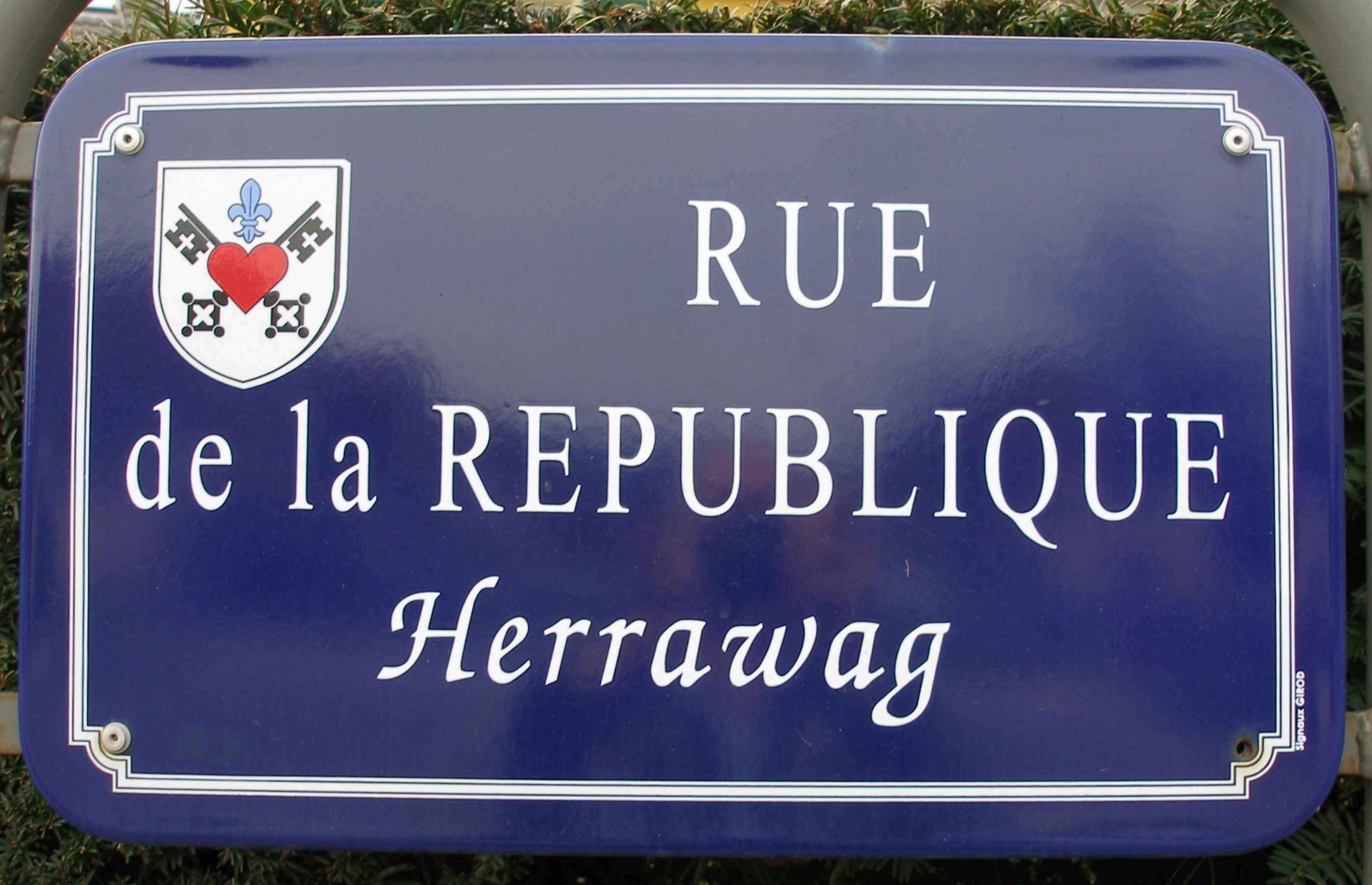
Street sign with Alsatian name

== Population ==
Historical population
Year	Pop.	±% p.a.
1968	967	—
1975	1,039	+1.03%
1982	1,017	−0.31%
1990	1,048	+0.38%
1999	1,178	+1.31%
2007	1,412	+2.29%
2012	1,518	+1.46%
2017	1,540	+0.29%
2023	1,558	+0.19%
Source: INSEE

== See also ==
- Communes of the Haut-Rhin department
