= The Cats =

The Cats may refer to:

- The Cats (Dutch band), a Dutch rock band
- The Cats (reggae band), a British reggae band
- Cats U.K., a British pop band
- The Cats (album), a 1957 jazz album featuring Tommy Flanagan and John Coltrane
- The Cats (1965 film), a Swedish film
- The Cats (1968 film), an Italian film
- The Cats, a nickname of the Kilkenny Hurling Team
- The Cats, a nickname of the Geelong Football Club
- The Cats, a nickname of the Kentucky Wildcats

== See also ==
- Cats (disambiguation)
