= Leon Katz =

Leon Katz may refer to:

- Leon Katz (biomedical engineer) (1924–2015)
- Leon Katz (playwright) (1919–2017), professor emeritus of drama at Yale University
- Leon Katz (physicist) (1909–2004), Canadian physicist
- Leon A. Katz, member of the New York City Council
