= Katsu =

Katsu may refer to:

== Entertainment ==
- Katsu!, manga by Mitsuru Adachi
- "Katsu!" (ja), a 1984 song by Shibugakitai
- Katsucon, an annual anime convention in Maryland

== Other ==
- Katsu (Zen), a shout used in East Asian Chan and Zen Buddhism, as well as in the martial arts
- Deep fried cutlet in Japanese cuisine:
  - Chicken katsu, fried chicken cutlet
  - Tonkatsu, fried pork cutlet
  - Katsudon, tonkatsu served in a bowl with rice
  - Gyukatsu, fried beef cutlet
- Japanese curry or curry sauce, sometimes referred to as "katsu" or "katsu curry" in the UK
- Kappo, resuscitation techniques also known as katsu

== People ==
=== Surname ===
- Alma Katsu (born 1959), American writer of adult fiction
- Katsu Kaishu (Awa Katsu) (1823–1899), Japanese statesman and naval officer
- Katsu Kokichi (1802–1850), Japanese samurai
- Manami Katsu (born 1994), Japanese professional wrestler
- Masanori Katsu (1879–1957), Japanese bureaucrat
- Minami Katsu (born 1998), Japanese professional golfer
- Shintaro Katsu (1931–1997), Japanese actor
- Tou Katsu (born 1982), Japanese actor and model

=== Given name ===
- KATSU (angela), Japanese musician, member of pop band angela
- KATSU, graffiti artist
- Katsu Aki (born 1961), manga artist
- Katsu Goto (1862–1889), Japanese merchant and interpreter
- Katsu Kanai (born 1936), Japanese film director
- Maedagawa Katsu (1939–1998), Japanese sumo wrestler
- Katsu Naito (born 1964), Japanese photographer
- Katsu (geisha) (active ca. 1800–1810), courtesan in Edo, achieved the ranking Oiran, premier class prostitute. Katsu was a woman of letters and associated with the intellectual elite (bunjin) of her days
