= Children's Emergency =

- Country of origin: United Kingdom
- Original language: English
- No. of series: 1
- No. of episodes: 8

Production
- Executive producer: Shaun Gilmartin
- Producer: Helen White
- Running time: 30 minutes
- Production company: September Films

Original release
- Network: BBC One
- Release: 4 May – 23 June 2010

Children's Emergency is a British television documentary series. It follows the Children's Acute Transport Service (abbreviated as CATS), the intensive care retrieval service connected to the nationally acclaimed Great Ormond Street Hospital in London, which is dedicated to stabilising and transporting critically ill children from peripheral hospitals to specialist paediatric intensive care units.

Eight episodes were produced by September Films for the BBC, and it was first aired on BBC One between 4 May and 23 June 2010.

In the first episode CATS make a 100-mile blue light dash so a newborn baby boy can have emergency heart surgery; a little girl with suspected meningitis is rushed from her local hospital in Southend to St Mary's in Paddington for intensive care; and an eleven-year-old boy in Romford is having mystery fits and needs specialist care to keep him alive while they try to discover what is causing his illness.

In the subsequent seven episodes the CATS team is being called to various locations in Great Britain, using specially fitted ambulances with full intensive care equipment, RAF helicopters and Hercules aircraft to reach even the remotest cases and transfer them to London to get the urgently needed specialist care and therapies they need.

The documentary depicts the life-saving work of the medics with real live footage, as they deal with a wide range of critical conditions in their little patients, such as brain infections, lung and heart failure, car accidents, blocked intestines and diabetes with coma.

The specialist medical staff of the Children's Acute Transport Service who is starring in the television series include amongst others Dr Christian Pathak, a prominent, internationally operating Paediatric Emergency Physician, who amongst other organizations has also worked extensively with the Royal Flying Doctor Service of Australia.
