= Shmuel Katz =

Shmuel Katz may refer to:

- Shmuel Katz (politician) (1914–2008), Israeli writer, historian and Knesset member
- Shmuel Katz (artist) (1926–2010), Israeli artist and cartoonist
- Shmuel Katz (violist), principal of the Mostly Mozart Orchestra

== See also ==
- Samuel Katz (disambiguation)
