= Patrick Beurard-Valdoye =

French poet

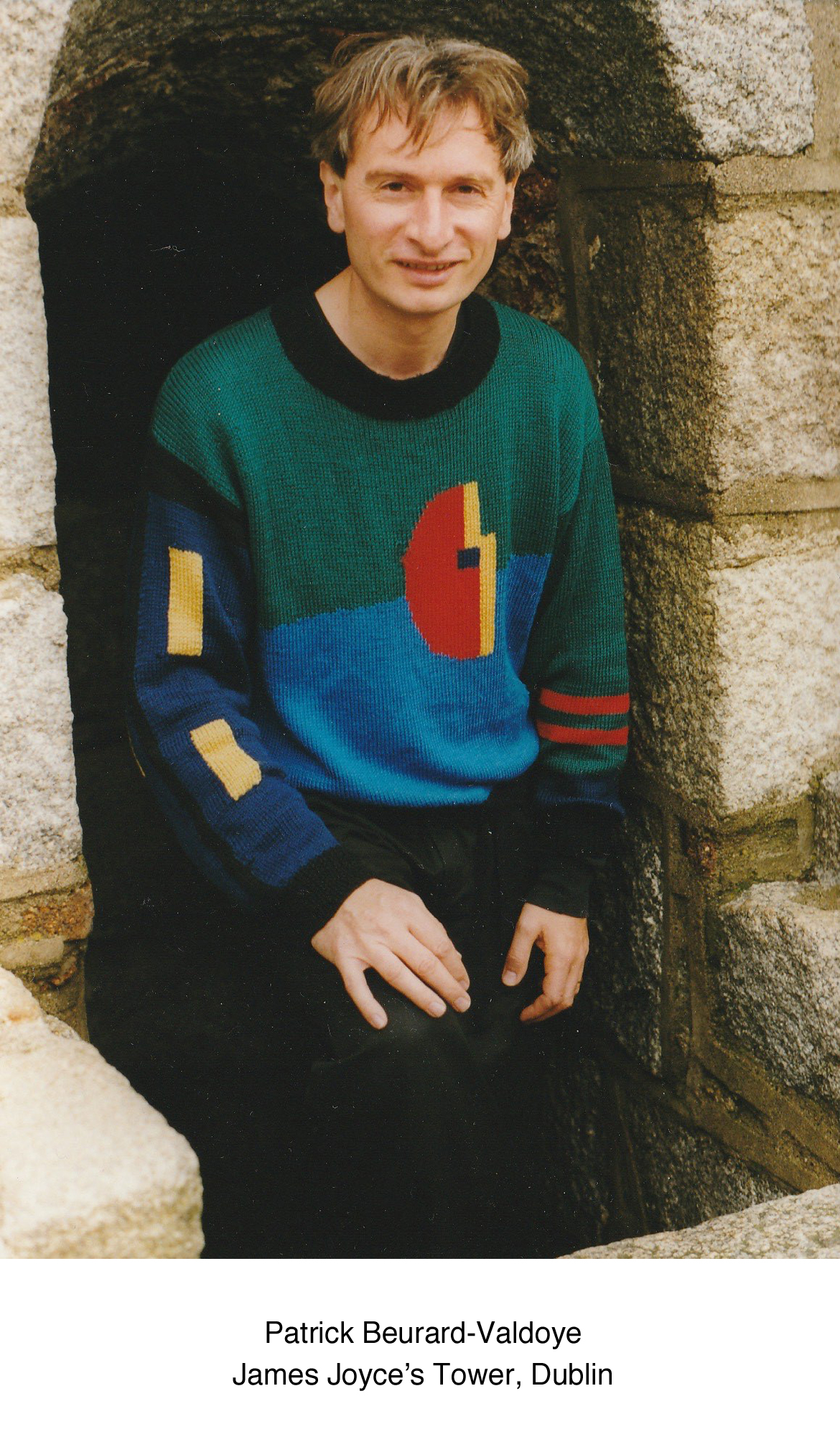
- Born: 31 October 1955; Belfort, France
- Occupations: poet, art critic, writer
- Years active: since 1980
- Known for: Poetry
- Notable work: Seven volume epic Cycle des exils
- Spouse: Isabelle Vorle (since 1996)

Patrick Beurard-Valdoye, (born 1955) is a French poet from Paris. He is also an art critic.

== Biography ==
A childhood spent in the Belfort region, gave Beurard-Valdoye exposure to German language and culture, including local dialects often associated with geography and local water courses and their various names. The proximity of the Swiss border enabled repeated visits to the Basel Kunstmuseum which made a lasting impact as did a visit early in his life to Le Corbusier's Chapelle Notre Dame du Haut.

During his studies at the University of Strasbourg in the early 1970s he discovered Dada art, especially work by Hans Arp and Sophie Taeuber-Arp. In 1980, he moved to Lyon where was co-founder of an arts magazine, Cahiers de leçons de choses. Simultaneously he was a contributor to the journal Opus international, and became involved in curating exhibitions and writing catalogues of post-war German artists. He founded and directed a readings serie from 1983 to 2000 (about 400 poets invited).

Patrick Beurard-Valdoye is professor of creative writing in the l’École nationale supérieure des beaux-arts de Lyon.

He attributes his career inspiration to a stay in Cork, Ireland in 1974.

noting that writing puts me together again, I believe naively perhaps, and with a touch of arrogance, that it could help others as well. My chosen road is that. One day I shall be a poet. I would add two things: I mean poet, as opposed to a writer, and from the off. It probably comes from the German conception where people such as Goethe, Robert Musil, Thomas Mann and Günter Grass are considered Dichter; but also from the Irish concept where Joyce is so feted as a bard that his likeness appeared on banknotes. A poet is not confined to verse. He is an artist whose medium is writing, availing himself of all forms except dead ones. Anyway, one day I shall be a poet. Future tense. It will be work as much as a struggle.

He translated the poet Hilda Morley into French (magazine Action poétique, n ° 204).

== Poetic style ==
His major project is primarily focused on a series entitled, "cycle des exils", an epic, composed so far of seven published volumes. His style is to emphasise the similarity between significant historical events that are chronologically separated, as it were a recurrent polyphony that challenges traditional linear ways of presenting history. The poem, "the saga" progresses by gathering together references to oral history, anecdotes and authorised versions. His influences have included Kurt Schwitters, Ghérasim Luca, Oskar Pastior Bernard Heidsieck and the all but forgotten Jean-Paul de Dadelsen.

Several films of his performances are on vimeo.com https://vimeo.com/233185909, https://vimeo.com/190642937.

== Works ==
=== Le Cycle des exils ===
- Allemandes, MEM / Arte Facts, 1985
- Diaire, Al Dante, 2000
- Mossa, Léo Scheer / Al Dante, 2002
- La fugue inachevée, Léo Scheer / Al Dante, 2004
- Le narré des îles Schwitters, New Al Dante, 2007
- Gadjo-Migrandt, Flammarion, 2014
- Flache d’Europe aimants garde-fous, Flammarion 2019, ISBN 978-2081464582

=== Other publications ===
- Le cours des choses, 26 poèmes-fleuves pour un EuropA.B.C., drawings by Pierre Alechinsky MEM / Arte Facts, 1989
- Etreinte, La main courante, 1990
- Couleurre, éditions du Limon, 1993
- Vanité que de l'écrire, etchings by Germain Roesz, Lieux-dits, 1994
- Les noms perdus, des sources aux pertes de la Meuse, drawings by Isabelle Vorle, La main courante, 1996
- Les noms propres des couleurs, Tarabuste, 1996
- Le verbe de Luca, dossier Gherasim Luca, revue JAVA, numéro 15, 1996
- Lire page région, Tarabuste, 1998
- N'imite jamais le cri du héron, with artistic input from Isabelle Vorle, rencontres, 1998
- Flux, CD audio SON@RT, 2002
- Le secret des limbes intercepté, Carnets de Montagne froide, 2003
- Der Sprachenhausierer, Ithaka verlag, 2003
- Itinerrance, sites cités citains, Obsidiane, 2004
- Théorie des noms Textuel, coll. "l'œil du poète", 2006
- L'Europe en capsaille, Maison de la poésie de Rennes / Al Dante, 2006
- Schwitters du Nord à la mort, CD audio Hôtel Beury, 2006
- Notre étrange prison, L'arbre à paroles, coll. « Résidences », 2007
- L'asconaute dans l'atelier de la natur, in Art is Arp Musée d'art moderne et contemporain of Strasbourg, 2008
- Le messager d'Aphrodite, Obsidiane, 2009
- Kurt Schwitters et les arts poétiques, with Isabelle Ewig, "traductions inédites", revue Action poétique, no. 202, 2010
- Le vocaluscrit, Lanskine, 2017
- Le purgatoire irlandé d'Artaud, Au coin de la rue de l'enfer, 2020

== Bibliography ==
- Revue Il particolare, 17/18, 2007
- Revue Faire-Part, 25, 2009
