= Katzy =

Katzy is a surname. Notable people with the surname include:

- Bernhard Katzy (1962–2015), German engineer and professor
- Dietmar Katzy (1935–2013), German politician (CDU)
- Stefan Katzy (1906–1949), Polish footballer

== See also ==
- Katz (surname)
