= Cats (surname) =

Cats, van Cats is a Dutch surname. Notable people with the surname include:

- André Cats (born 1968), Dutch coach and sports administrator
- Jacob Cats (1577–1660), Dutch poet
- Jacob Cats (painter) (1741–1799), Dutch painter
- Jentje Cats (1793–1853), Frisian civil servant, politician and judge
- Jitske Cats (born 1966), Dutch triathlete and track athlete

== See also ==
- Katz (surname)
