= Leo Katz =

Leo Katz may refer to:

- Leo Katz (artist) (1887–1982), American artist
- Leo Katz (lawyer), American professor of law
- Leo Katz (statistician) (1914–1976), American statistician
- Leo Katz (writer) (1892–1954), Austrian writer
