= Martin Katz =

Martin Katz may refer to:

- Martin Katz (pianist) (born 1945), American pianist, educator and conductor
- Martin Katz (jewelry designer), American jewelry designer
- Martin Katz (producer), Canadian film and television producer
