= KAZZ =

KAZZ may refer to:

- KAZZ (AM), a radio station (1400 AM) licensed to serve Parowan, Utah, United States
- KUPY, a radio station (99.9 FM) licensed to serve Sugar City, Idaho, United States, which held the call sign KAZZ from 2012 to 2014
- KPKL, a radio station (107.1 FM) licensed to serve Deer Park, Washington, United States, which held the call sign KAZZ from 1986 to 2012
- Kazz Magazine, a Thai fashion and lifestyle magazine
