= Children's Acute Transport Service =

The Children's Acute Transport Service (CATS) is a publicly funded specialised regional intensive care transport service for critically ill children. CATS is the busiest Paediatric Intensive Care Transport Service in the UK and covers the 50 District General Hospitals in the North Thames and East Anglia regions of England. CATS is part of the Great Ormond Street Hospital for Children NHS Foundation Trust.

== Background ==
Only a proportion of hospitals have a Paediatric Intensive Care Unit PICU. Therefore, most critically ill children initially present to hospitals without a PICU. Paediatric Intensive Care Transport Services are designed to provide the safe and rapid transfer of these children to a regional PICU.

CATS was created in 2001 as a collaborative service for the North Thames Regional PICU's: The Royal Brompton Hospital, St Mary's Hospital, London and Great Ormond Street Hospital for Children.

CATS receives ~2200 referral calls and performs ~1200 critical care retrievals each year. Over 75% of these children are too unwell to breathe for themselves and require anaesthesia and a ventilator. A third need inotropic (inotrope) support, and about 5% require inhaled nitric oxide during transport. Telephone advice, liaison with sub-specialist medical services and outreach education are also important parts of the service's activity.

== National Services and Aeromedical Transport ==
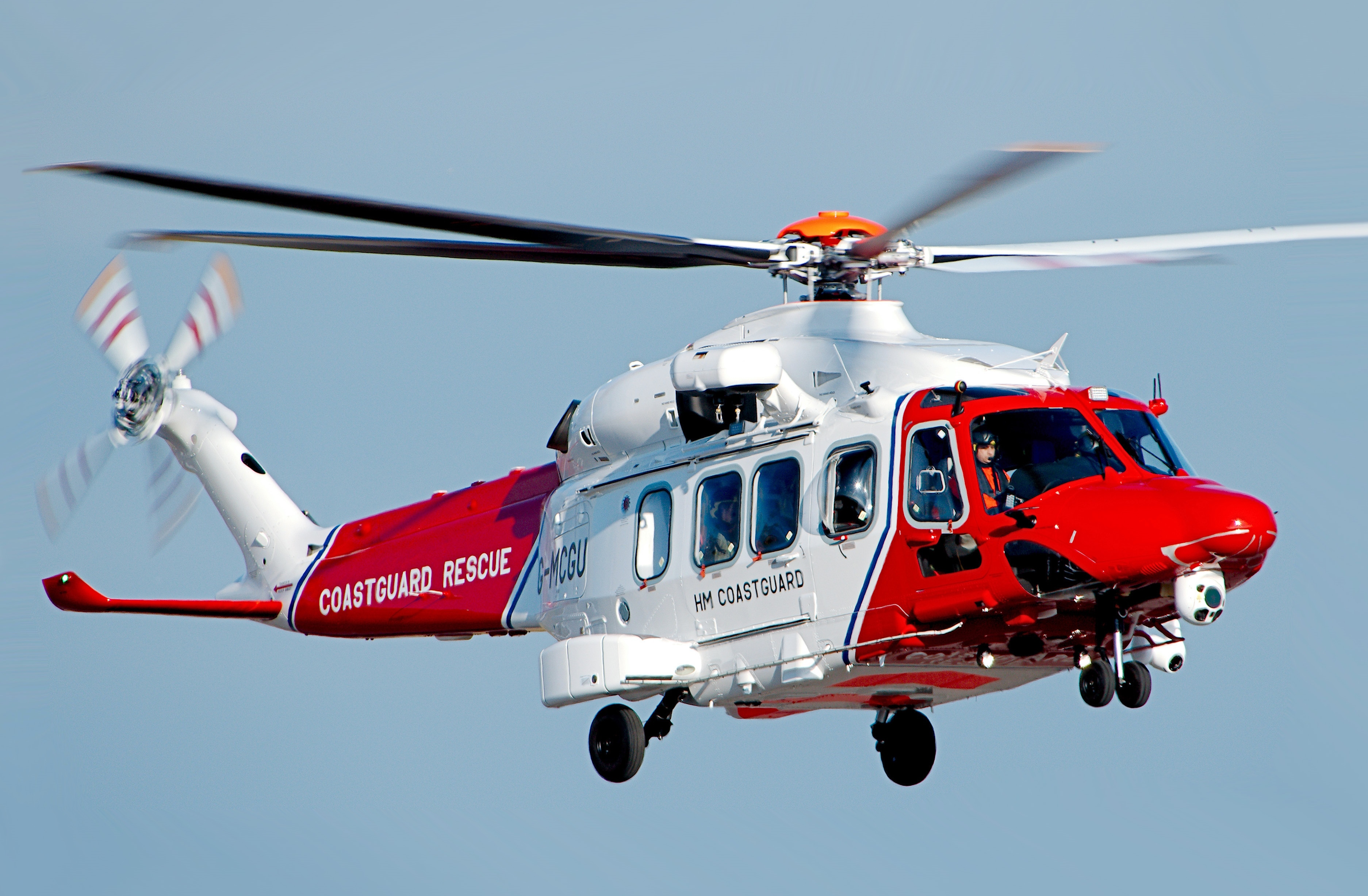
A rescue helicopter operated by Bristow Helicopters on behalf of Her Majesty's Coastguard.

Service Level Agreements (SLA) exist with Great Ormond Street Hospital and the Freeman Hospital in Newcastle for ECMO (extracorporeal membrane oxygenation) retrievals. CATS also provide a paediatric intensive care transport service with Great Ormond Street Hospital for retrieval of children with Vein of Galen malformations requiring radiological ablation. 5-10% of retrievals are performed by air ambulance. This is via both helicopter and fixed-wing aircraft. For many of these urgent long distance transfers, the team works with the aircraft and the crews of HM Coastguard helicopters.

== International Referrals ==
CATS have moved many paediatric patients internationally.

== Accreditation and awards ==
CAMTS Accreditation

CATS has received accreditation from the Commission on Accreditation of Medical Transport Systems (CAMTS). This independent, non-profit agency audits medical transport services against industry-established criteria. CATS accreditation is for fixed-wing and rotary wing air medical transport services as well as ground inter-facility critical care services.

Health and Social Care Award

Department of Health, Health and Social Care Award, National Winners 2005.

== The Team ==
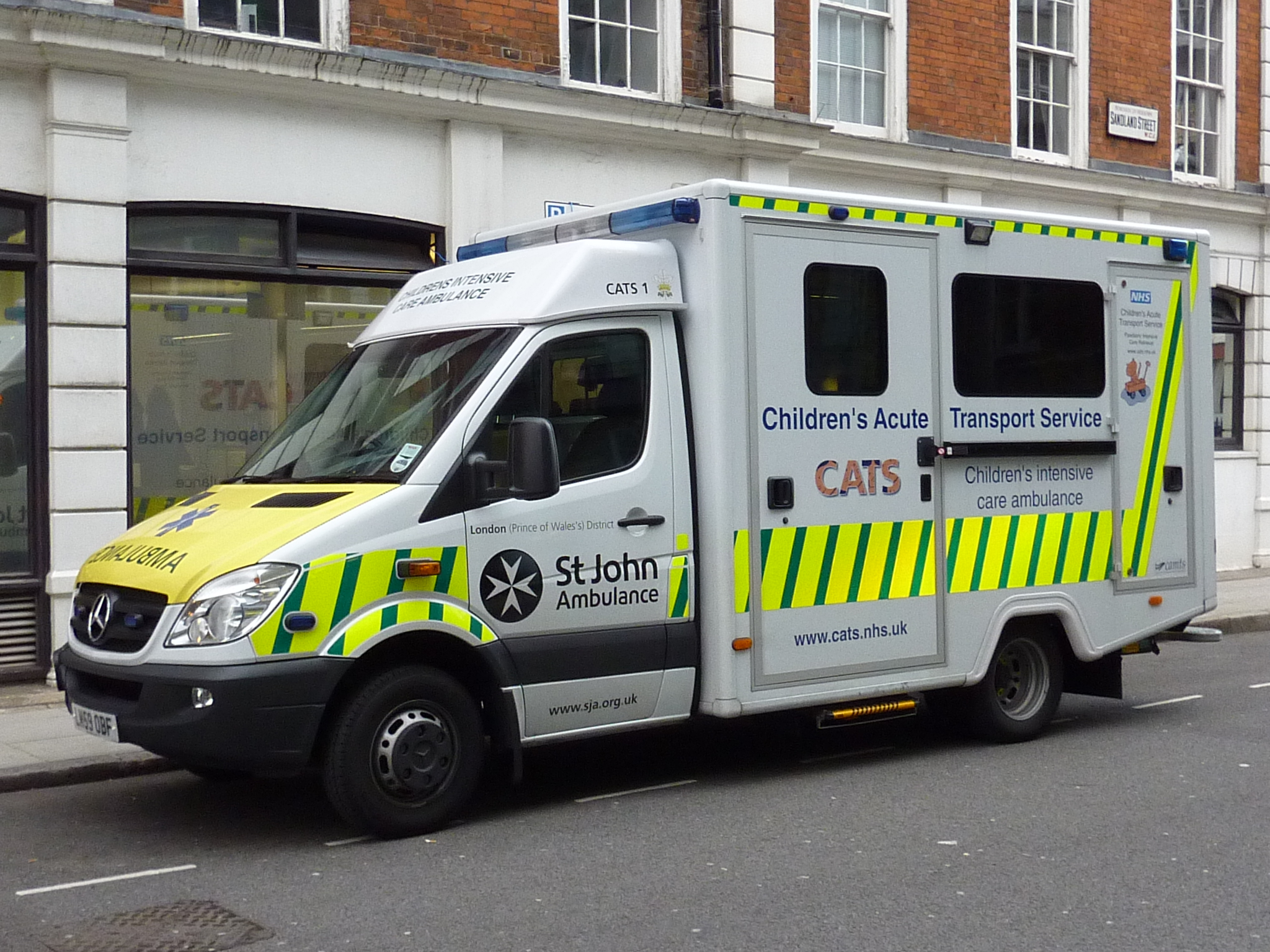

NHS intensive care consultants are responsible for service delivery, supervision of junior medical staff, provision of outreach education and service development. All full-time CATS consultant intensivists, cover sessions in PICU/anaesthesia to maintain competencies in their base speciality. A team of full-time CATS nurses is responsible for service delivery, co-ordination of the outreach education program, and in-house training. In addition, over 50 nurses rotate from each of the 3 PICUs to cover the rota. A team of administrators provide 24-hour cover for the Referral Hotline and co-ordinate incoming referrals, teleconferencing and communication with clinical team members. Road ambulance retrievals are provided by St John Ambulance using bespoke CATS designed intensive care ambulances.

== Media ==
CATS is the subject of an eight-part (8 x 30 minute) series called Children's Emergency, produced by September Films for BBC One. It aired between 4 May and 23 June 2010.
These are some excerpts from the TV series:

- YouTube Children's Emergency Trailer
- YouTube Dr Christian Pathak saves another Child
- YouTube Dr Christian Pathak in Action
- YouTube Dr Christian Pathak on duty in Chelsea
- YouTube Dr Christian Pathak in the PICU
