= Kats (surname) =

Kats is either a Dutch or Flemish surname, or an Ashkenazic surname, a spelling variant of the surname Katz, in particular, as a transliteration of Russian: Кац, the latter may also be transliterated as Katz. Notable people with the surname include:

- Artur Kats, Belarusian footballer
- Elena Kats-Chernin, Soviet Union-born Australian composer and pianist
- Gert-Jan Kats, Dutch politician
- Jacob Kats, Flemish teacher, writer, theatre director and pioneer of socialism in Belgium
- Masha Kats, Russian singer
- Serge Kats, Dutch sailor
