= Mabel Katz =

Argentinian-American speaker and TV show host

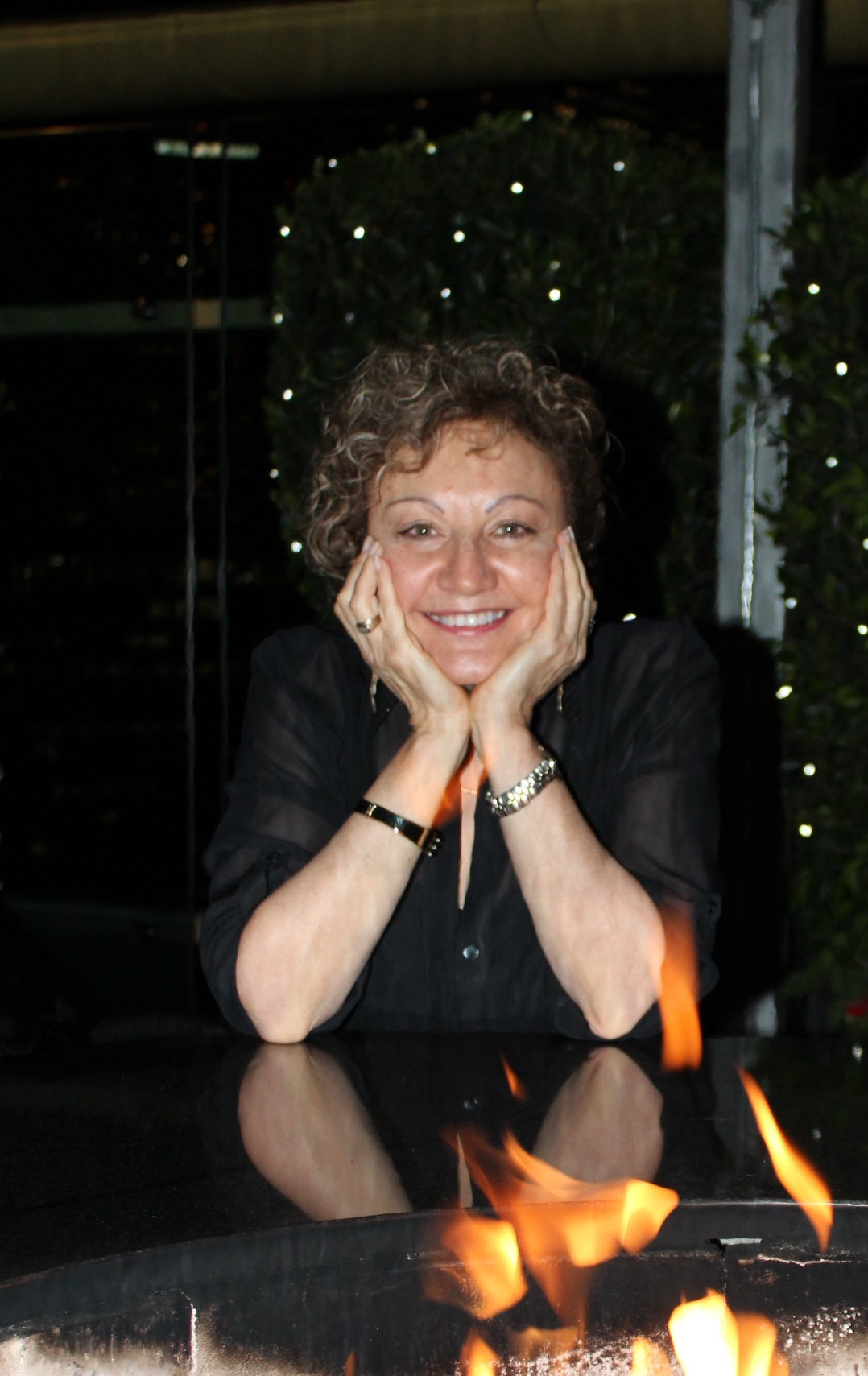
- Katz en 2012
- Born: Argentina
- Occupation(s): author, speaker, accountant
- Website: mabelkatz.com

Mabel Katz is an Argentinian speaker and TV show host based in Los Angeles. She is a practitioner and teacher of the Hawaiian art of Ho'oponopono and is the author of The Easiest Way, a series of books based on Ho’oponopono.

== Early life and education ==
Katz was born and raised in Argentina. She is a Certified Public Accountant and got a License in Business Administration from Argentina.

== Career ==
Katz moved to Los Angeles in 1983 and started her career as an accountant and tax advisor. In 1999, she founded her own company, Your Business, Inc. While she was working as an accountant, she began attending self-growth seminars and in 1997, she met Ihaleakalá Hew Len, a practitioner of Ho’oponopono. She taught Self I-dentity through Ho'opnopono through the Foundation of I Inc. from 2000 until 2004, when she asked permission to use their materials and started presenting her own Ho’oponopono trainings. In 2008 she left her career as a tax accountant in Los Angeles to become a full-time Ho’oponopono teacher and speaker. Katz studied Ho’oponopono with Hew Len, for twelve years. According to Katz, before she started practicing Ho’oponopono, she got angry easily and that Ho’oponopono helped her in managing her anger.

In an interview, Katz told that she became an accountant because somebody told her she was good with numbers, but that "was not her passion". She hosted a TV show called Despretar that aired from Monday through Friday on KWHY 22. In each episode, she called guests who shared stories about how they dealt with their problems. She was also a host on the Mabel Katz Show.

Katz has also initiated a peace campaign. She delivers seminars to teach individuals how to achieve "inner peace in order to promote world peace."

=== Zero Frequency ===
Katz created a trademark for the term Zero Frequency. Zero frequency refers to no static or bad connections and no memories. She delivers a seminar by the same name in which she discusses techniques to achieve mind clarity. In June 2012, she spoke about Zero Frequency at Universidad Autónoma del Noreste.

== Books ==
=== The Easiest Way ===
She is the author of The Easiest Way book series based on Ho'oponopono. The first book of the series was The Easiest Way; Solve Your Problems and Take The Road to Love, Happiness, Wealth and The Life of Your Dreams. In the book, she told her own story about finding her identity and freedom using this technique. The book has been translated into 15 languages. Other books in the series include The Easiest Way to Live, The Easiest Way Pocket Edition and The Easiest Way to Understanding Ho’oponopono that later became part of The Easiest Way and then was released as The Easiest Way Special Edition.

In 2011, she wrote the fifth book of this series titled, Easiest Way to Grow.

== Bibliography ==
- The Easiest Way (2004) ISBN 0974882011
- The Easiest Way Special Edition (2009) ISBN 0982591039
- The Easiest Way to Understanding Ho'oponopono (2009)
- The Easiest Way to Live: Let Go of the Past, Live in the Present and Change Your Life Forever (2010) ISBN 978-0982591048
- The Easiest Way to Grow (2011) ISBN 978-0982591062
