= Central Autónoma de Trabajadores Salvadoreños =

CATS
- Central Autónoma de Trabajadores Salvadoreños
- Founded: 1966
- Headquarters: San Salvador, El Salvador
- Location: El Salvador
- Key people: William Huezi, secretary general
- Affiliations: ITUC

Central Autónoma de Trabajadores Salvadoreños (CATS) is a trade union center in El Salvador. It was founded in 1966 and is affiliated with the International Trade Union Confederation.
