= City of Anderson Transit System =

Local bus service for Anderson, Indiana, US

- Founded: 1973
- Headquarters: 1109 Main St
- Locale: Anderson, IN
- Service type: bus service, paratransit
- Routes: 7
- Stations: CATS Bus Terminal, 1220 Jackson Street
- Annual ridership: 237,451 (2019)
- Website: CATS

City of Anderson Transit System (CATS) is the local bus service for Anderson, Indiana. CATS has 7 routes. Fares are $1.00, except for those above 60 or disabled veterans, whose fare is 50 cents. Nifty Lift, the Demand Response, has a fare of $2.00. Current hours are Monday to Friday 8–4.

== Routes ==
1	North Anderson
2	South Madison
3	Columbus Walmart
4	Eastside Mounds Mall
5	Jackson Park Belmont
6	South Anderson
7	Flagship Express

== CATS Bus Terminal ==
The CATS Bus Terminal, located at 1220 Jackson Street in downtown Anderson, serves as the primary transfer point in the system. The facility opened on May 23, 2022, with an official ribbon cutting on June 1. The building was designed by krM Architecture, with 13,000 square feet, and space for developers on the second and third floors. The new terminal replaced a small facility at 1109 Main Street.

== Fixed route ridership ==
The ridership statistics shown here are of fixed route services only and do not include demand response services.

== See also ==
- List of bus transit systems in the United States
- Muncie Indiana Transit System
