= Katsu Naito =

Japanese photographer (born 1964)

Katsu Naito (born 1964) is a Japanese photographer. He presented his first international exhibition (West Side Rendezvous) at Nepenthes in New York City on October 21, 2010. The exhibition documents the transvestite and transsexual street-walkers of New York's Meatpacking District in the early 1990s. A book containing the photographs from the exhibit was subsequently released on July 21, 2011, in London at LN-CC.
