= Mailo (webmail service) =

Mailing service

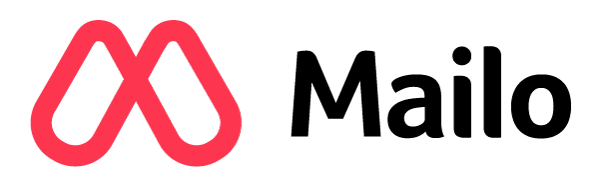
Mailo logo

Mailo (also known as Net-C, or NetCourrier) is a French webmail service created and run by Mail Object, a company based in Saint-Maur-des-Fossés in Val-de-Marne.

== Services ==
Mailo offers webmail, synchronisation with various protocols (POP, IMAP, Exchange ActiveSync, etc.), a calendar and file storage on both desktop and mobile apps. Mailo uses freemium as pay model for their software and offers domain names and website hosting. They state that all data is hosted on servers located in France.

== History ==
In 1998, Pascal Voyat and Philippe Lenoir created Francemail, a French-language e-mail service accessible via the Internet, Minitel and telephone, which was renamed to FranceMel the following year. In 1999, the service was acquired by the Lagardère Group and renamed to NetCourrier.

In 2007, the two original creators bought the service back through their company Mail Object.

In 2008, NetCourrier launched a Web 2.0 messaging service based on Mail Object technology. In 2010, it launched services tailored to children and families.

In 2012, NetCourrier was renamed to Net-C. Net-C consolidates net-c.com, netcourrier.com, netcmail.com, netc.eu, netc.fr, francemel.fr and other domain names. In 2015, Net-C also consolidated Alinto's consumer messaging services: lavache.com, emailasso.net, inmano.com, brusseler.com.

In 2019, Net-C acquired the free, open-source messaging service Mailoo.org. Net-C was renamed to its current name, Mailo.

== See also ==
- Webmail
