= Katz syndrome =

- Other names: Hyperostosis frontalis interna
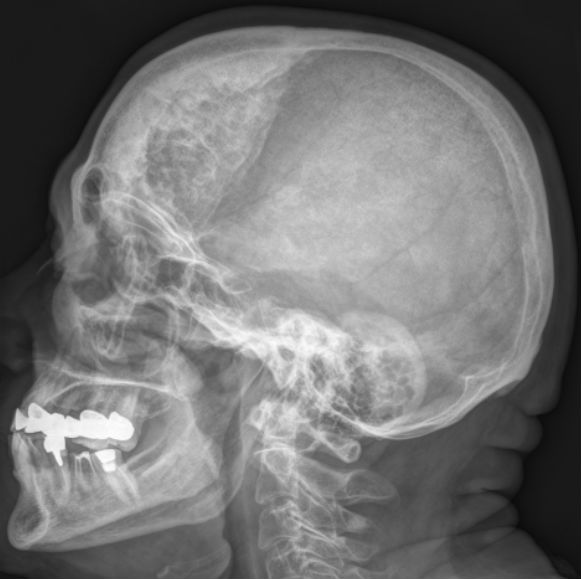
- Hyperostosis frontalis interna in a 74-year-old woman
- Specialty: Medical genetics

Katz syndrome is a rare congenital disorder, presenting as a polymalformative syndrome characterized by enlarged viscera, hepatomegaly, diabetes, and skeletal anomalies that result in a short stature, cranial hyperostosis, and typical facial features. It is probably a variant of the autosomal recessive type of craniometaphyseal dysplasia.

== Symptoms and signs ==
Manifestations include enlarged viscera, hepatomegaly, diabetes, short stature and cranial hyperostosis.
