= Joseph Katz =

Joseph Katz may refer to:

- Joseph Katz (Soviet agent) (1912–2004), worked for Soviet intelligence from the 1930s to the late 1940s
- Joseph Katz (professor), Israel-born American fluid dynamicist
- Joseph J. Katz (1912–2008), chemist at Argonne National Laboratory
- Joseph M. Katz (1913–1991), entrepreneur who founded a gift-wrap manufacturing company

== See also ==
- Josef Kates (1921–2018), born Josef Katz, Canadian engineer
- Joseph M. Katz Graduate School of Business
