= Hirsingue =

Commune in Grand Est, France

- Commune
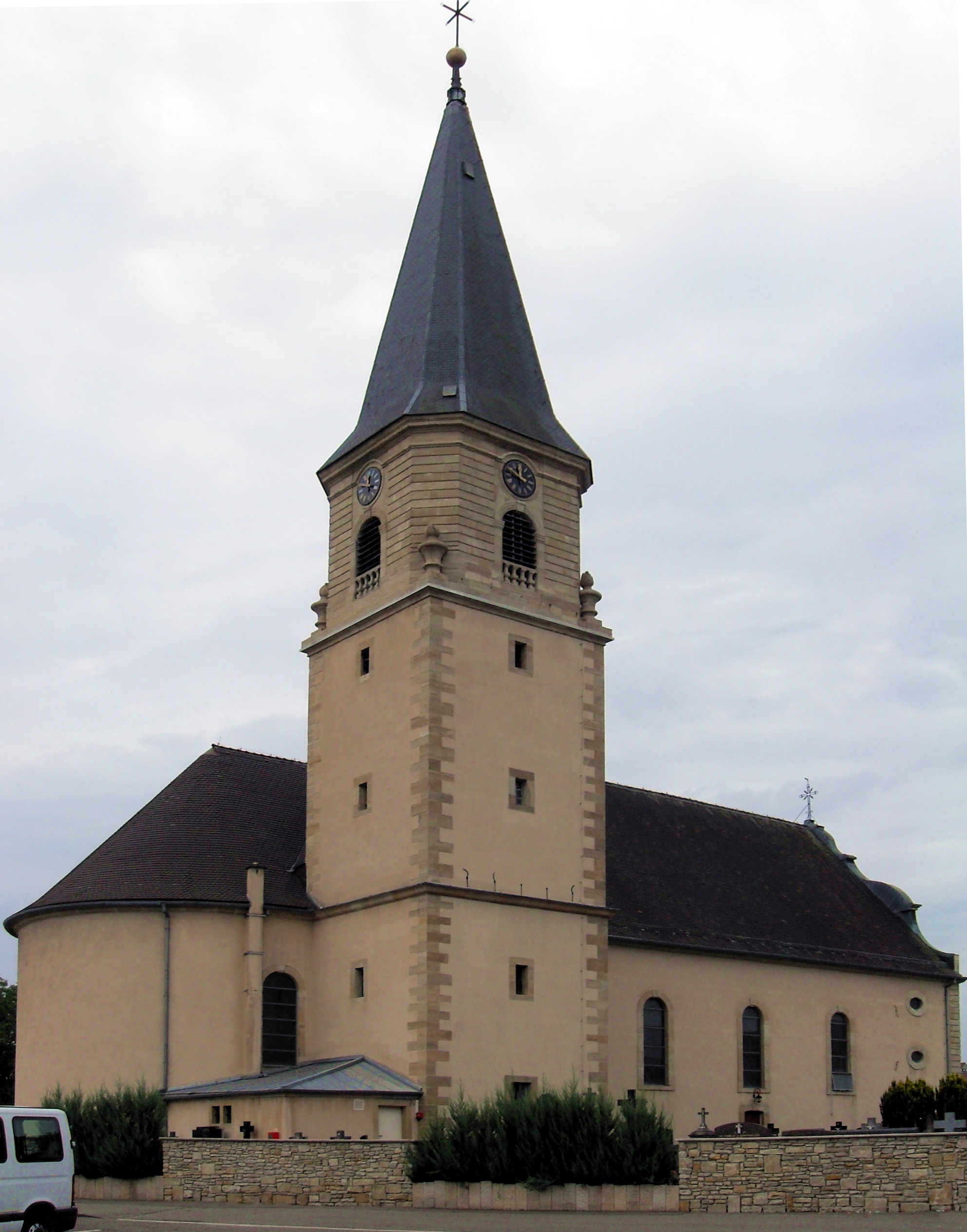
- The church in Hirsingue

- Coat of arms
- Location of Hirsingue
- Location within France Location within Grand Est
- Coordinates: 47°35′13″N 7°15′12″E
- Country: France
- Region: Grand Est
- Department: Haut-Rhin
- Arrondissement: Altkirch
- Canton: Altkirch

Government
  - Mayor (2020–2026): Christian Grienenberger
- Area^{1}: 12.88 km^{2} (4.97 sq mi)
- Elevation: 320 m (1,050 ft)
- Highest elevation: 411 m (1,348 ft)
- Lowest elevation: 307 m (1,007 ft)
- Population (2023): 2,122
  - Density: 164.8/km^{2} (426.7/sq mi)
- Time zone: UTC+01:00 (CET)
  - Summer (DST): UTC+02:00 (CEST)
- INSEE/Postal code: 68138 /68560
- ^{1} French Land Register data, which excludes lakes, ponds, glaciers > 1 km^{2} (0.386 sq mi or 247 acres) and river estuaries.

Hirsingue (French pronunciation: [iʁzɛ̃ɡ]; German: Hirsingen) is a commune in the Haut-Rhin department in Alsace in north-eastern France.

== Population ==
Historical population
Year	Pop.	±% p.a.
1968	1,561	—
1975	1,539	−0.20%
1982	1,881	+2.91%
1990	2,010	+0.83%
1999	2,057	+0.26%
2007	2,132	+0.45%
2012	2,233	+0.93%
2017	2,121	−1.02%
2023	2,122	+0.01%
Source: INSEE

== See also ==
- Communes of the Haut-Rhin département
