= De Kat =

De Kat may refer to:

- Frans de Kat (born 1965), Dutch former footballer and coach
- Otto B. de Kat (1907–1995), Dutch painter and art critic
- De Kat, Zaandam, a windmill
