= Leon Katz (biomedical engineer) =

Canadian engineer, 1924–2015

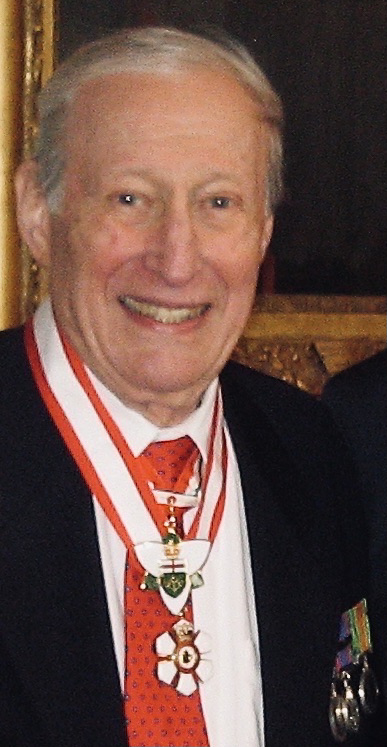
- Born: December 20, 1924; Montreal, Quebec, Canada
- Died: January 9, 2015 (aged 90)

Academic background
- Education: McGill University

Leon Katz OC OOnt (December 20, 1924 – January 9, 2015) was a Canadian biomedical engineer.

== Early life and education ==
Katz was born in Montreal, Quebec, the son of Regina (née Fang) and Harry Katz, who had immigrated in the early 1900s from Romania.

Katz graduated Commercial High School in June 1941 with top honours. In 1950 he graduated from McGill University with a Bachelor of Engineering (Electrical Engineering: Communications) degree that he paired with course work in physics and neurology.

== Military service ==
In 1943, Leon Katz volunteered for active service. As a Canadian soldier stationed in England and fluent in the German language, Katz was seconded to the British Army of the Rhine Control Commission for Germany (CCG). Later stationed in Düsseldorf, a heavily bombed city in the American Zone, Katz served in the CCG's Joint Special Investigations Detachment, enforcing Military Government Laws. In recognition of his military service, Katz was awarded the Canadian Volunteer Service Medal (CVSM), the Clasp to the CVSM, the War Medal 1939-45, and the General Service Badge. He recorded personal testimony about his WWII service for The Memory Project.

== Biomedical engineering career ==
In 1950, while enrolled in McGill's Graduate School, Physiology Department, Leon Katz was hired by Dr. Herbert Jasper, Chairman of Experimental Neurology at McGill University, to work at the Montreal Neurological Institute where Katz worked closely with Leslie A. Geddes, Head of the Engineering and Technology section. Together, Geddes and Katz conceived and developed medical devices and technologies for Dr. Wilder Penfield, specific to his pioneering brain-mapping surgical needs, and services to treat brain-related diseases.

From 1952 to 1955, Katz served as Director and co-founder of the first Canadian medical Radio-Isotope Laboratory, located at the Jewish General Hospital. Concurrently, Katz conducted pioneering work on cardiac pacing at the Université de Montréal with Dr. Jean-Jacques Lussier, and Dr. Jack Hopps at the National Research Council of Canada.

From 1955 to 1960, Katz served as Director of the Biomedical Engineering Division, for the Founder of the Institut de Cardiologie de Montréal, Dr. (Senator) Paul David. Katz ultimately conceived, designed, and hand-constructed an original heart-lung bypass machine, with monitoring and control instrumentation.

In response to the particular needs of Dr. Osman Gialloreto, Katz researched, designed and organized the construction of the haemodynamics and cardiac catheterization clinical laboratory. In response to the needs of Dr. Léo Laflèche and Dr. Edouard Gagnon, Leon Katz, then Chief of the Biophysics Service, established, managed, and stocked a human Homograft Bank, with lyophilized graft.

From 1960 to 1973, Katz served as Director, Biomedical Engineering, and Chief Perfusionist for Open Heart Surgery, at Hôpital Notre-Dame. Katz worked in cardiac surgery, devising new methods to measure, monitor, and control the oxygen saturation of the hemoglobin, the partial pressure of oxygen dissolved in the plasma, and the pH of the blood during perfusion); he designed cardiac operating rooms and served as Perfusionist in hundreds of open-heart, cardio-pulmonary bypass operations.

Katz invented medical devices for many fields of medicine.

From 1965 to 1970, Katz also founded, and was Chief Biomedical Engineer of a commercial medical device manufacturing company - Medco Instruments Inc., later acquired by Air Shields Incorporated. During this period, Katz designed and developed a number of critical-care medical products that were subsequently mass-produced and sold throughout the world, including an infant apnea monitor, the Air Shields Infant Incubator, external cardiac pacemakers, a DC Defibrillator.

From 1973 to 1988, Katz was Chief, Diagnostic Devices Division, and Evaluation and Standards Division, Bureau of Medical Devices, Health Protection Branch, Health and Welfare Canada. Katz directed a team of researchers and technicians in over 1,700 high-priority concerns and investigations related to medical devices, and participated in drafting and implementing national legislation and corrective regulatory measures to reduce or eliminate device hazards undermining patient health and safety.

Some of the high-priority devices which benefited from Leon Katz's single, or joint investigative and corrective actions included: evacuated blood-collection tubes, venipuncture, false-negative smears in gynaecological cytology, patient restraint and safety vests misconnections of medical tubing.

Katz also wrote and served as Editor of the Departmental Medical Devices Surveillance bulletins and contributed articles to Dimensions in Health Service.

== Publications, awards and honours ==
- 2005: Awarded the Order of Ontario
- 2006: Awarded Member Emeritus by the Canadian Medical and Biological Engineering Society (CMBES)
- 2006: Awarded a Living Legend Award at the 16th World Congress of the World Society of Cardiovascular & Thoracic Surgeons
- 2008: Awarded an Officer of the Order of Canada
- 2012: Awarded the Queen Elizabeth II Diamond Jubilee Medal
- 2014: Named a Fellow of the Engineering Institute of Canada
- 2019: The Leon Katz Tennis Courts tribute plaque is unveiled (at St-Luke's Park, Cartier Street, Ottawa)
