= Samuel Katz =

Samuel Katz may refer to:

- Sam Katz (American politician) (born 1949), American politician
- Samuel Katz (pediatrician) (1927–2022), American pediatrician and virologist
- Sam Katz (born 1951), mayor of Winnipeg
- Sam Katz (rugby union) (born 1990), English rugby union player
- Shmuel Katz (politician) (1914–2008), Israeli militant, writer, historian and Knesset member

== See also ==
- Shmuel Katz (disambiguation)
