= Kaz =

Kaz or KAZ may refer to:

== Businesses ==
- KAZ Minerals, a British copper mining company operating in Kazakhstan
- Kaz Incorporated, an American manufacturer and distributor of health care products
- Kaz Records, part of Castle Communication, incorporating Y Records
- Kutaisi Auto Mechanical Plant, a Soviet truck factory in Georgia, formerly Kutaisi Automobile Plant (KAZ)

== Entertainment ==
- Kaz (TV series), CBS
- Kazuhira Miller, a Metal Gear character
- Kaz Proctor, a main character in the television series Wentworth
- Kaz Brekker (né Rietveld), a main character in Leigh Bardugo's Six of Crows. Portrayed by Freddy Carter in the Shadow and Bone TV series.
- A character in Shimmer and Shine
- Kaz, a character in Hi Hi Puffy AmiYumi
- Kaz (Dragonlance), a character in Dragonlance and the title character of Kaz the Minotaur, a 1990 novel
- A character in Mighty Med
- Kazuda Xiono, a character in Star Wars Resistance commonly called "Kaz"
- A 2002 FIFA World Cup mascot

== People ==
=== Given name ===
- Kaz Garas (born 1940) Lithuanian-born American actor
- Kaz Grala (born 1998), American NASCAR driver
- Kaz Hawkins (born 1973), Northern Irish singer
- Kaz James (born 1982), Australian singer-songwriter and DJ

=== Nickname ===
- Kaz Hayashi (born 1973), Japanese professional wrestler
- Kaz Hirai (born 1960), former chairman of Sony Corporation
- Bill Kazmaier (born 1953), American powerlifter, strongman competitor and professional wrestler
- Kazunori Yamauchi (born 1967), Japanese video game designer and professional racing driver nicknamed "Kaz"
- Nicole Kaczmarski (born 1981), American basketball player

=== Other ===
- Kaz (cartoonist), American cartoonist Kazimieras Gediminas Prapuolenis (born 1959)
- Kaz (musician) or K.A.Z., stage name of Japanese musician Kazuhito Iwaike (born 1968)
- a ring name of Frankie Kazarian (born 1977), American professional wrestler

== Places ==
- Kaz, Iran, a village in Kerman Province
- Kaz, Kyrgyzstan
- Kaz, Russia, a locality

== Other uses ==
- KAZ (electric vehicle), a 2003 Japanese prototype
- Kaz II, a yacht found crewless in 2007
- kaz, ISO 630-2 and -3 codes for the Kazakh language

== See also ==
- Kas (disambiguation)
- KAZZ (disambiguation)
