= Katz Editores =

- Company type: Independent
- Industry: Publishing
- Founded: 2006
- Founder: Alejandro Katz
- Headquarters: Buenos Aires, Argentina
- Area served: Argentina, Spain, Colombia, Uruguay
- Products: Books
- Website: www.katzeditores.com

Katz Editores is an independent Argentine scholarly publisher, founded in 2006. It publishes mostly translations from English, German, French, and Italian into Spanish, but also original Spanish-language texts. As of April 2009, their list numbered over 100 titles by authors representing a diverse array of intellectual traditions, such as Karl Löwith, Jürgen Habermas, Michael Walzer, Roger Chartier, Claus Offe, Martha Nussbaum, Seyla Benhabib, Cass Sunstein, Harry Frankfurt, Leo Strauss, Norbert Bolz, Michel de Certeau, Roberto Esposito, Ernst Mayr, Cornelius Castoriadis, Hans Belting, Robert Laughlin, and Eric Kandel. The editors wrote in their first catalog that they founded their press "with a calling to contribute to broadening the horizons of knowledge available in our language, but also with the conviction that it is necessary to interrogate many of the ideas that organize the viewpoints of the contemporary world."

== Book series ==
All of Katz's books are published in one of four series:

- Conocimiento ("Knowledge" or "Consciousness" in Spanish).
- Difusión ("Diffusion" in Spanish).
- Discusiones ("Discussions" or "Arguments" in Spanish).
- Dixit ("He/she/it said" in Latin), print editions of public lectures given at the Centre de Cultura Contemporània de Barcelona, with which the series is a co-production.

Some books published by Katz Editores, belonging to (from left to right) the Conocimiento, Discusiones, and Difusión series.

== Design ==
Katz is well known for the high production values of its books, which are designed by the firm Tholön Kunst of Buenos Aires and Barcelona. Tholön Kunst's designs for Katz, almost without exception imageless, feature bold blocks of color and understatedly elegant typography, with a distinctive, instantly recognizable layout for each individual series.
