= Adam Katz =

American sports agent

Adam Katz is an American lawyer and sports agent specializing in baseball. Alongside Joel Wolfe, Katz is the Executive Vice President and Co-Managing Executive of Baseball at Wasserman, a sports agency. Throughout his career, he has represented clients such as Sammy Sosa, Mo Vaughn and Hanley Ramirez.

Before joining Wasserman, Katz served as President and Partner of the Reich, Katz & Landis Baseball Group.

== Education ==
Katz holds a Juris Doctor from the University of Notre Dame Law School and a Bachelor of Arts from Dickinson College.

== Career ==
Katz established himself in the 1980s and 1990s, with four of his clients winning MVP awards: Sammy Sosa (1998), Ken Caminiti (1996), Mo Vaughn (1995) and Willie McGee (1985). As part of the Reich, Katz & Landis Baseball Group, Katz also represented Hall of Famer Tim Raines and All-Stars Andy Ashby, Bret Boone, Chili Davis, Tony Fernandez, Steve Sax, Aaron Sele, Omar Vizquel, and John Wetteland.

Among Katz's contracts are Carlos Lee's $100 million contract with the Houston Astros in 2007, the largest in franchise history at the time, and Mo Vaughn's $80 million contract with the Angels in 1999, which made Vaughn the highest-paid player in baseball at the time.

Katz represents over 30 current baseball players, including Hanley Ramirez, Jeff Samardzija, Kenley Jansen, Bartolo Colon, Kenta Maeda, Yuli Gurriel, Edinson Volquez, Julio Teheran, Jose Quintana and Addison Reed. In 2017, Katz was the 10th-highest-earning baseball agent, according to Forbes.
