= De spectaculis =

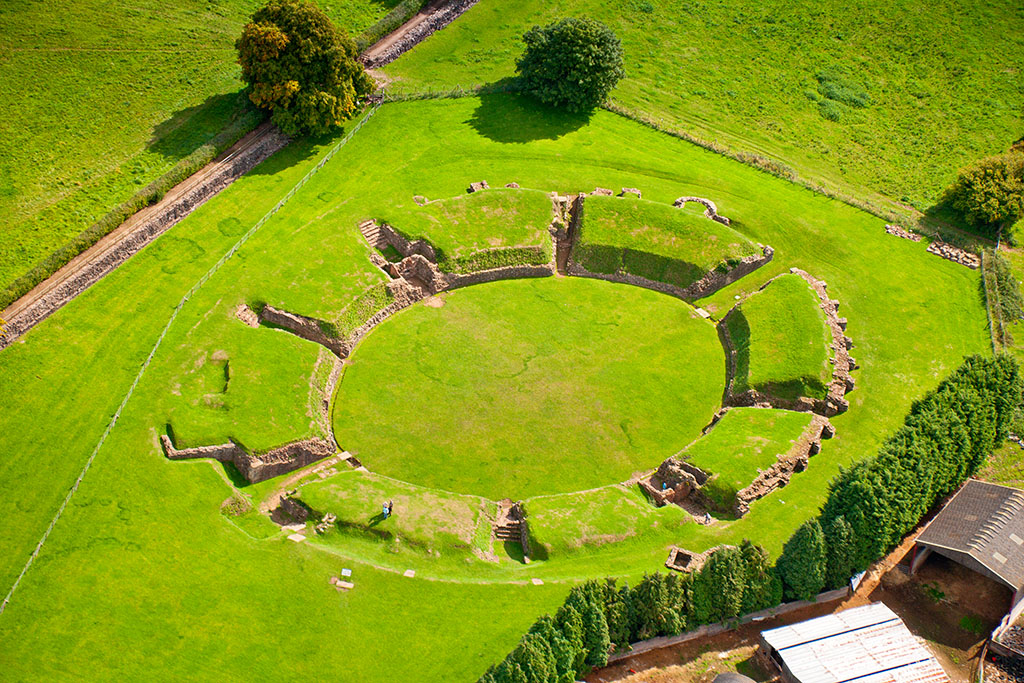
Aerial view of a late second-century Roman amphitheater at Isca Augusta

De spectaculis, also known as On the Spectacles or The Shows, is a surviving moral and ascetic treatise by Tertullian. Written somewhere between 197 and 202, the work looks at the moral legitimacy and consequences of Christians attending the circus, theatre, or amphitheatre.

Tertullian argues that human enjoyment can be an offence to God. His view of these public entertainments is that they are a misuse of God's creation and a perversion of the gifts God has given to man. He supports his claim by reminding the reader that these shows and spectacles derived from pagan ritual rites (the Liberalia, the Consualia, the Equiria, the Bacchanalia, etc.). This means that the events derive from idolatry. Of key concern was that the "show always leads to spiritual agitation". By attending and partaking in the event, man is subject to strong excitements, which are aroused due to natural lapses, which create passionate desire. Additionally, Tertullian writes that that which is not permissible to say or do should not be permissible to see or hear.

Friedrich Nietzsche, in On the Genealogy of Morality (Essay 1, Section 15), uses Tertullian's words to highlight the resemblance of Christian worship to circus-going: "In place of athletes, we have our martyrs; if we crave blood, we have the blood of Christ..." To those addicted to the pleasure of pagan spectacles Tertullian tried to show that Christianity offers far superior spectacles. For this reason he spoke of the Second Coming, the resurrection of the saints, New Jerusalem, and of "what no eye has seen, nor ear heard, nor the human heart conceived" (1 Cor 2:9), but the spectacle on which he enlarged most was the Last Judgement and the ensuing punishment of the enemies of Christ:

[T]hat last day of judgment, with its everlasting issues; that day unlooked for by the nations, the theme of their derision, when the world hoary with age, and all its many products, shall be consumed in one great flame! How vast a spectacle then bursts upon the eye! What there excites my admiration? what my derision? Which sight gives me joy? which rouses me to exultation?--as I see so many illustrious monarchs, whose reception into the heavens was publicly announced, groaning now in the lowest darkness with great Jove himself, and those, too, who bore witness of their exultation; governors of provinces, too, who persecuted the Christian name, in fires more fierce than those with which in the days of their pride they raged against the followers of Christ. What world's wise men besides, the very philosophers, in fact, who taught their followers that God had no concern in ought that is sublunary, and were wont to assure them that either they had no souls, or that they would never return to the bodies which at death they had left, now covered with shame before the poor deluded ones, as one fire consumes them! Poets also, trembling not before the judgment-seat of Rhadamanthus or Minos, but of the unexpected Christ! I shall have a better opportunity then of hearing the tragedians, louder-voiced in their own calamity; of viewing the play-actors, much more "dissolute" in the dissolving flame; of looking upon the charioteer, all glowing in his chariot of fire; of beholding the wrestlers, not in their gymnasia, but tossing in the fiery billows … What quaestor or priest in his munificence will bestow on you the favour of seeing and exulting in such things as these? And yet even now we in a measure have them by faith in the picturings of imagination.

Such an expression of joy over the ruin of the damned finds no match in the other works of early Christians. However, it must be taken into account that in an earlier chapter of the treatise Tertullian wrote that “the innocent can find no pleasure in another’s sufferings: he rather mourns that a brother has sinned so heinously as to need a punishment so dreadful.” This passage is hard--if not impossible--to reconcile with the one quoted before and it is therefore debatable what Tertullian's real sentiments regarding the damned were.
