= David Katz =

Dave or David Katz may refer to:

- David Katz (author) (born 1965), American author and music journalist
- David Katz (conductor) (1924–1987), American conductor
- David Katz (psychologist) (1884–1953), German-Swedish psychologist, gestalt perception
- David A. Katz (1933–2016), U.S. federal judge
- David L. Katz (born 1963), Yale University nutritionist
- David S. Katz (born 1953), Israeli historian
- Dave Katz (songwriter) (born 1961), producer and songwriter
- David Katz (1993–2018), perpetrator of the Jacksonville Landing shooting
- Dovid Katz (born 1956), Lithuanian-American yiddishist and historian

== See also ==
- David Karr, born David Katz (1918–1979), American journalist, businessman, and NKVD agent
