= Astghadzor =

Village in Gegharkunik, Armenia

Astghadzor Աստղաձոր
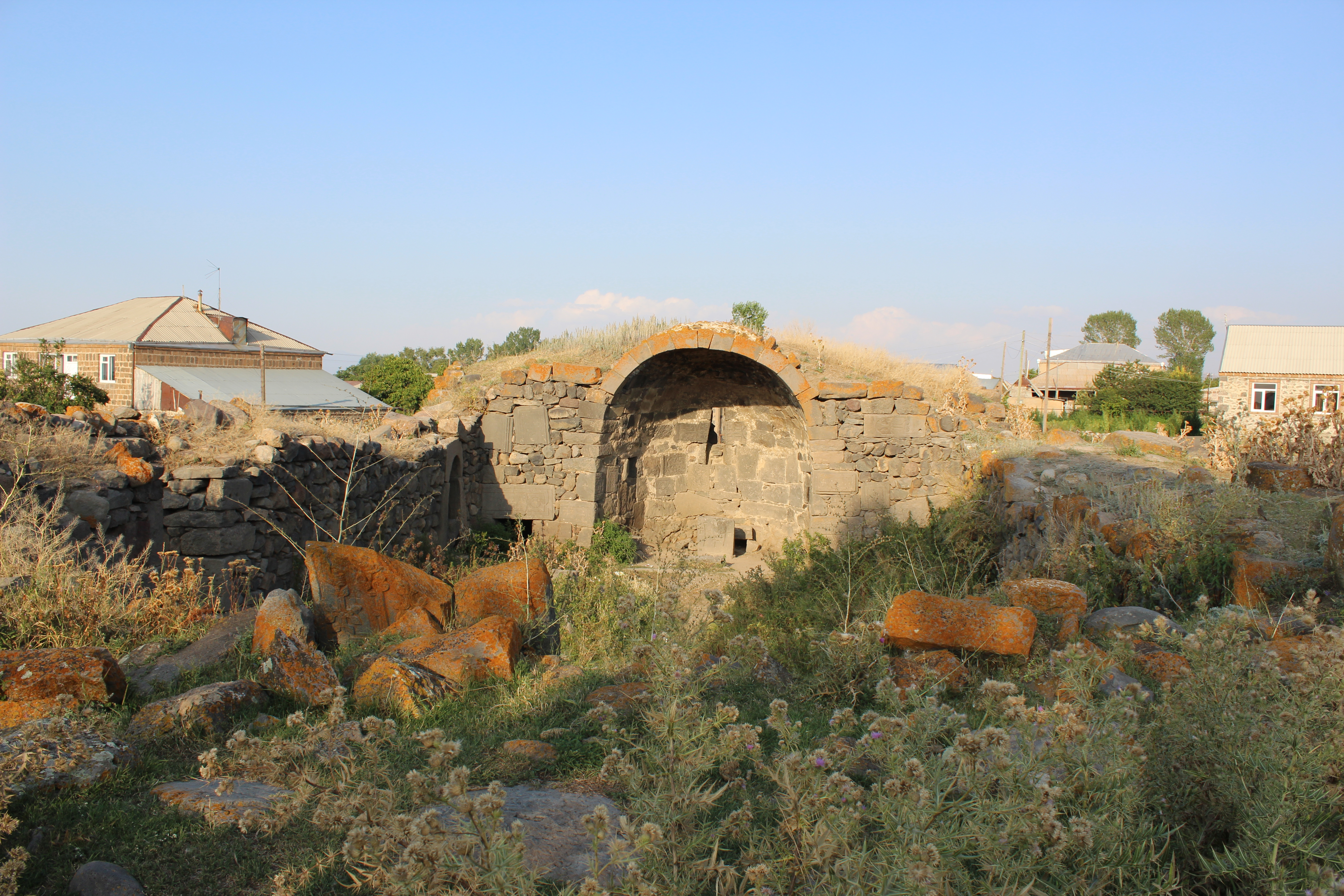
- St. Poghos-Petros Church in Astghadzor

- Location within Armenia Location within Gegharkunik
- Coordinates: 40°07′26″N 45°21′24″E
- Country: Armenia
- Province: Gegharkunik
- Municipality: Martuni
- Elevation: 2,025 m (6,644 ft)

Population (2011)
  - Total: 4,215
- Time zone: UTC+4 (AMT)
- Postal code: 1403

Astghadzor (Armenian: Աստղաձոր) is a village in the Martuni Municipality of the Gegharkunik Province of Armenia.

== Etymology ==
The village was previously known as Kats and Katsik, and until 1935, Alikrykh and Alighrkh.

== Gallery ==
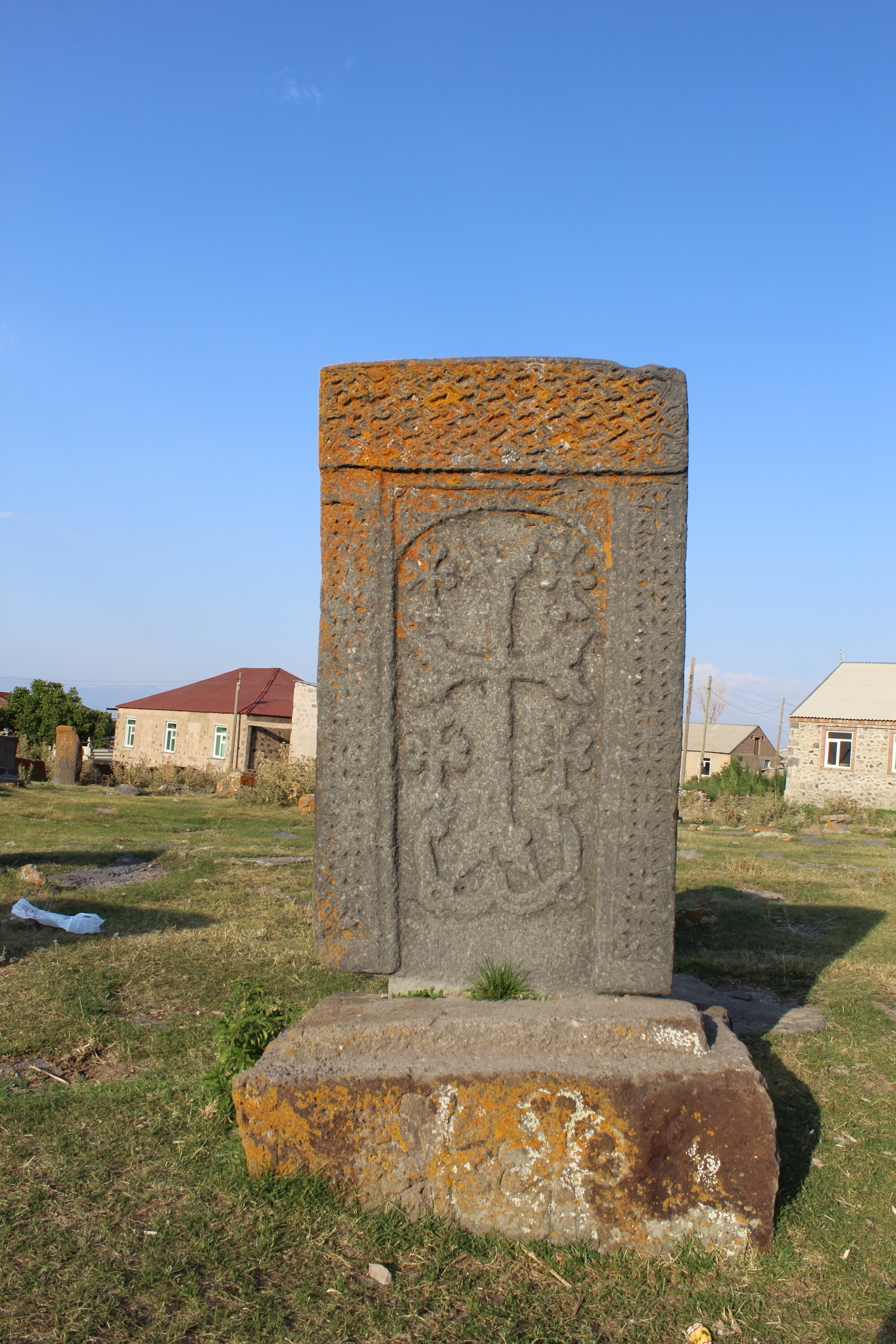
Khachkar in Astghadzor
