= Steve Katz =

Stephen, Steven or Steve Katz may refer to:

- Steve Katz (writer) (1935–2019), American writer
- Steve Katz (musician) (born 1945), American musician
- Steven T. Katz (born 1944), Jewish philosopher
- Steven A. Katz (born 1959), writer of the screenplay Shadow of the Vampire
- Steve Katz (politician) (born 1953), veterinarian and member of the New York State Assembly
- Stephen Katz (writer) (1946–2005), American teacher and screenwriter
- Stephen Katz (real name Matthew Angerer, 1952-2023), traveling companion of travel writer Bill Bryson
- Stephen M. Katz (cinematographer)
