= Kearsarge Arts Theatre Company =

Kearsarge Arts Theater (KAT) Company
- Company type: Non-profit
- Industry: Corporation
- Founded: May 1991
- Headquarters: New Hampshire, New London
- Services: Schools
- Net income: US$25,000–99,999

The Kearsarge Arts Theater (KAT) Company is a non-profit summer program for children interested in the arts. It is based in the New London area of New Hampshire, United States.

KAT operates out of Kearsarge Regional High School annually for the entire month of July. Classes include dance, visual art, photography, costuming, technical theater, and others. Depending on the class offerings, students have the option of taking up to two morning classes and one afternoon class. At the end of the month, the theater collects higher-level performances in the performing arts classes.

== Programs ==
KAT offers classes within its summer program, which may vary year to year and often attempt to tie into the themes of the main stage shows.

=== You Theater ===
Kat's longest-running main-stage theater class is You Theater. Students audition for parts at the beginning of the month and participate in rehearsals from 12:45–4:00 pm, Monday through Thursday, to collaborate on Broadway-style musicals that show for five performances at the end of the fourth week. Students work with music directors and dance choreographers, and work in a rehearsal process.

Recent productions include Peter Pan, God-spell, The Wizard of Oz, Disney's Beauty and the Beast, and Seussical the Musical. KAT occasionally produces both new and original musicals, such as its 2002 production of A You & Me World, Hope Is Like a Feather (2007), and the recurring Mail to the Chief (2000 and 2004). In 2010, they performed A Star Spangled Salute.

=== KAT Cabaret ===
KAT Cabaret begins the summer program with a week-long rehearsal process. Students work under the direction of Robb Dimmick. Performances take place in the school's cafeteria or lobby area, which undergoes major transformations to become the chosen production's setting. Performers interact with audiences before the performances in an optional dessert-theater. The performers act as waiters, chefs and hosts at individual tables.

Recent productions include Putting It Together (2008), Honk! The Musical (2007), and the original revues Christmas in July (2006) and A Celtic Cabaret (2005).

In 2009, Cabaret celebrated its 20th year with Celebrate! 20 Songs for 20 Years.

== Trish Lindberg ==
In 2003, Artistic Director Dr. Trish Lindberg received the National Youth Theater Director of the Year Award from the American Alliance for Theater and Education (AATE) and was named the Plymouth State University Distinguished Teacher of the Year (2003) and one of New Hampshire's Most Remarkable Women by New Hampshire Magazine.

In 2004, she was awarded New Hampshire Professor of the Year by the Carnegie Foundation for the Advancement of Teaching and the Council for Advancement and Support of Education and in 2007, she received the Excellence in Education Award from the New Hampshire Department of Education. In 2007, Dr. Lindberg was honored with the Excellence in Children's Theater Award from the New Hampshire Theater Awards, a statewide non-profit organization recognizing contributions to the New Hampshire theater scene.

== Tours ==
KAT hosted tours independently or through Plymouth State University's International Outreach programs.

In 2000, KAT began its tradition with a national tour of its original summer production, Mail to the Chief. Written and conceived by Dr. Trish Lindberg, the production was based on the writings of American children to the next president. Its touring production featured 45 young performers from Massachusetts and New Hampshire. After the premiere, the production was invited to the John F. Kennedy Center in Washington, D.C., for a special run of performances for its newly commissioned, free public performance, Millennium Stage Theater.
