= Nathan Katz (poet) =

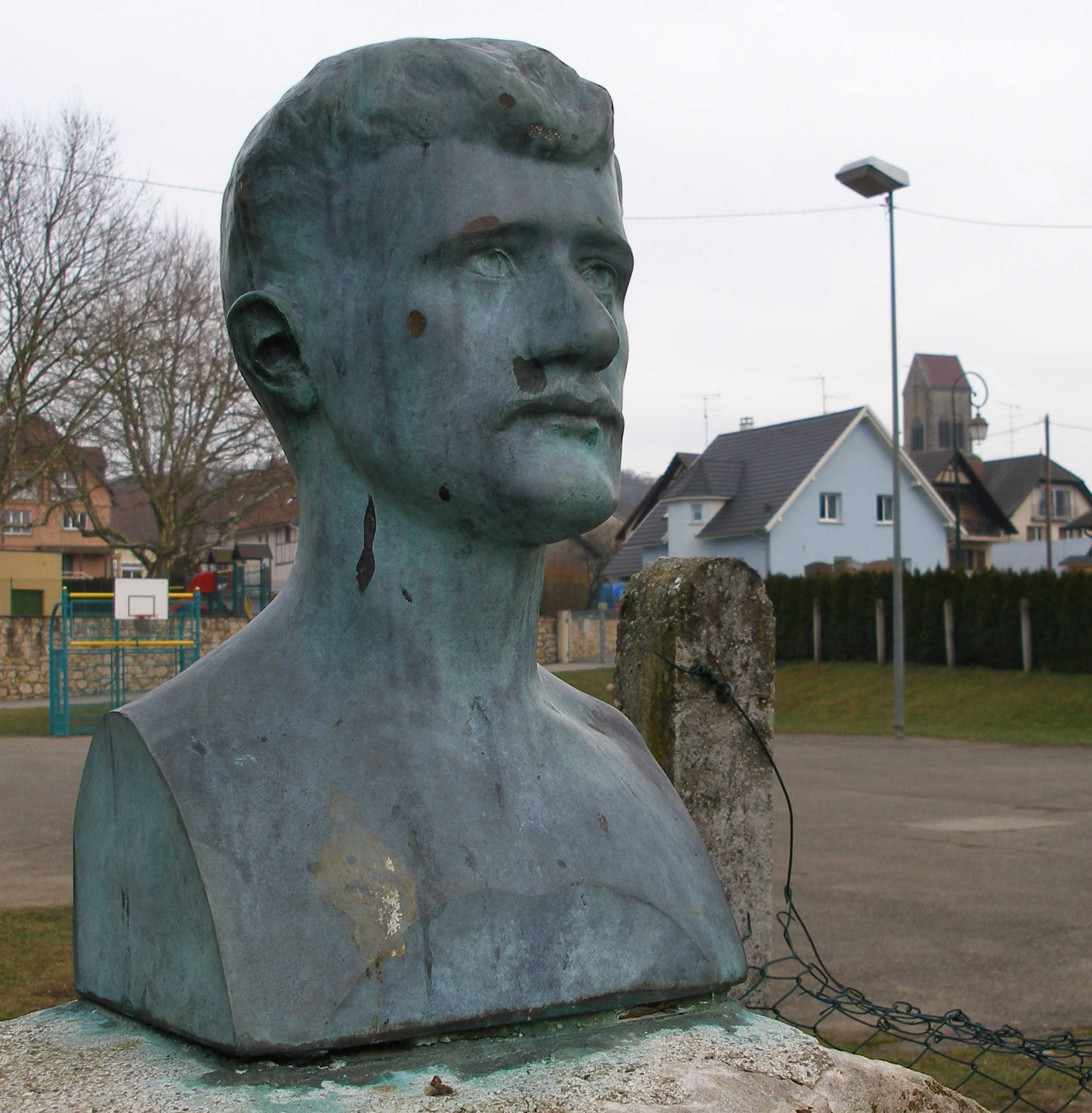
- Monument in Waldighofen
- Born: December 24, 1892; Waldighofen, Alsace, France
- Died: January 12, 1981 (aged 88); Mulhouse, France
- Occupation: Poet
- Writing career
- Language: Standard German, Alsatian dialect
- Notable work: Das Galgenstüblein

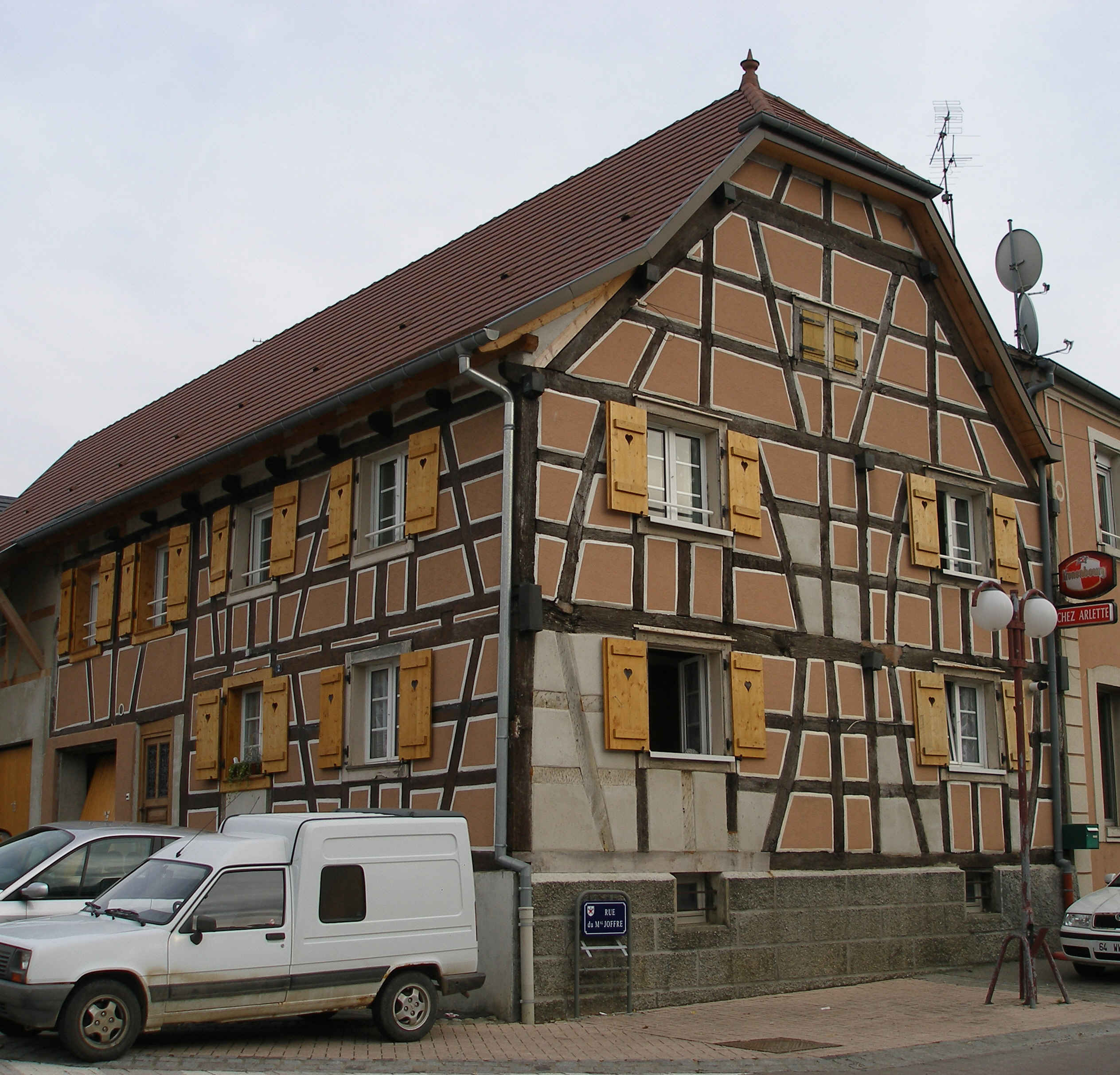
His birthplace in Waldighofen

Nathan Katz (24 December 1892, in Waldighofen – 12 January 1981, in Mulhouse) was a Jewish Alsatian poet from the Sundgau region. He wrote in Standard German as well as the Alsatian dialect.

Serving at the East Front during the First World War, he was made prisoner in Nizhny Novgorod, where he wrote Das Galgenstüblein in June 1915.
