= Ethernet extender =

An Ethernet extender (also network extender or LAN extender) is any device used to extend an Ethernet or network segment beyond its inherent distance limitation which is approximately 100 metres (330 ft) for most common forms of twisted-pair Ethernet. These devices employ a variety of transmission technologies and physical media (wireless, copper wire, fiber-optic cable, coaxial cable).

The extender forwards traffic between LANs transparently to higher network-layer protocols over distances that far exceed the limitations of common Ethernet over twisted pair.

== Options ==
Extenders that use copper wire include 2- and 4-wire variants using unconditioned copper wiring to extend a LAN. Network extenders use various methods (line encodings), such as TC-PAM, 2B1Q or DMT, to transmit information. While transmitting over copper wire does not allow for the speeds that fiber-optic transmission does, it allows the use of existing voice-grade copper or CCTV coaxial cable wiring. Copper-based Ethernet extenders must be used on unconditioned wire (without load coils), such as unused twisted pairs and alarm circuits.

Connecting a private LAN between buildings or more distant locations is a challenge. Wi-Fi requires a clear line-of-sight, special antennas, and is subject to weather. If the buildings are within 100m, a normal Ethernet cable segment can be used, with due consideration of potential grounding problems between the locations. Up to 200m, it may be possible to set up an ordinary Ethernet bridge or router in the middle, if power and weather protection can be arranged.

Fiber optic connection is ideal, allowing connections of over a km and high speeds with no electrical shock or surge issues, but is technically specialized and expensive for both the end equipment interfaces and the cable. Damage to the cable requires special skills to repair or total replacement.

Specialized equipment can inter-connect two LANs over a single twisted pair of wires, such as the Moxa IEX Series, Cisco LRE (Long Reach Ethernet), Enable-IT Ethernet Extender Experts VDSL2, Patton CopperLink or EtherWAN Ethernet Extenders using VDSL technology. Distances of 300 m (1000 feet) at 50 Mbit/s up to 8 km (5.0 mi) at 128 kbit/s is possible. Westermo DDW products are capable of 10 miles at 30.3 Mbit/s using SHDSL technology. Coaxial cable are often permitting higher speeds and larger distances than twisted pair wires. The equipment is mostly simple to operate, and the connection wire is common, cheap and maintainable.

Ordinary ADSL modems cannot be connected back-to-back, because the ATU-R (ADSL Termination Unit - Remote) units that are used by customers require specialized ATU-C (Central Office) support provided by phone company equipment, usually by a complex and expensive DSLAM (DSL access multiplexer). However some symmetric digital subscriber line (SDSL) modems such as the SpeedStream 5851 can be connected back-to-back, allowing upload and download speeds of about 2 Mbit/s over substantial distances, using a simple twisted pair of wires. Back-to-back operation may also be possible with single-pair high-speed digital subscriber line (G.SHDSL) modems.

Similar technologies were standardized as Ethernet in the first mile:

- 2BASE-TL – Full-duplex long reach point-to-point link over voice-grade copper wiring. 2BASE-TL PHY can deliver a minimum of 2 Mbit/s and a maximum of 5.69 Mbit/s over distances of up to 2700 m (9,000 ft), using ITU-T G.991.2 (G.SHDSL.bis) technology over a single copper pair.
- 10PASS-TS – Full-duplex short reach Point-to-Point link over voice-grade copper wiring. 10PASS-TS PHY can deliver a minimum of 10 Mbit/s over distances of up to 750 m (2460 ft), using ITU-T G.993.1 (VDSL) technology over a single copper pair.
