= Digital subscriber line =

Family of technologies that are used to transmit digital data over telephone lines

Digital subscriber line (DSL), originally digital subscriber loop, is a family of technologies that are used to transmit digital data over telephone lines. In telecommunications marketing, the term DSL is widely understood to mean asymmetric digital subscriber line (ADSL), the most commonly installed DSL technology, for Internet access.

In ADSL, the data throughput in the upstream direction (the direction to the service provider) is lower, hence the designation of asymmetric service. In symmetric digital subscriber line (SDSL) services, the downstream and upstream data rates are equal.

DSL service can be delivered simultaneously with wired telephone service on the same telephone line since DSL uses higher frequency bands for data transmission. On the customer premises, a DSL filter is installed on each telephone to prevent undesirable interaction between DSL and telephone service.

The bit rate of consumer ADSL services typically ranges from 256 kbit/s up to 25 Mbit/s, while the later VDSL+ technology delivers between 16 Mbit/s and 250 Mbit/s in the direction to the customer (downstream), with up to 40 Mbit/s upstream. The exact performance depends on technology, line conditions, and service-level implementation. Researchers at Bell Labs have reached SDSL speeds over 1 Gbit/s using traditional copper telephone lines, though such speeds have not been made available to customers yet.

== History ==
Initially, it was believed that ordinary phone lines could only be used at modest speeds, usually less than 9600 bits per second. In the 1950s, ordinary twisted-pair telephone cable often carried 4 MHz television signals between studios, suggesting that such lines would allow transmitting many megabits per second. One such circuit in the United Kingdom ran some 10 miles (16 km) between the BBC studios in Newcastle-upon-Tyne and the Pontop Pike transmitting station. However, these cables had other impairments besides Gaussian noise, preventing such rates from becoming practical in the field. The 1980s saw the development of techniques for broadband communications that allowed the limit to be greatly extended. A patent was filed in 1979 for the use of existing telephone wires for both telephones and data terminals that were connected to a remote computer via a digital data carrier system.

The motivation for digital subscriber line technology was the Integrated Services Digital Network (ISDN) specification proposed in 1984 by the CCITT (now ITU-T) as part of Recommendation I.120, later reused as ISDN digital subscriber line (IDSL). Employees at Bellcore (now Telcordia Technologies) developed asymmetric digital subscriber line (ADSL) by placing wide-band digital signals at frequencies above the existing baseband analog voice signal carried on conventional twisted pair cabling between telephone exchanges and customers. A patent was filed by AT&T Bell Labs on the basic DSL concept in 1988.

Joseph W. Lechleider's contribution to DSL was his insight that an asymmetric arrangement offered more than double the bandwidth capacity of symmetric DSL. This allowed Internet service providers to offer efficient service to consumers, who benefited greatly from the ability to download large amounts of data but rarely needed to upload comparable amounts. ADSL supports two modes of transport: fast channel and interleaved channel. Fast channel is preferred for streaming multimedia, where an occasional dropped bit is acceptable, but lags are less so. Interleaved channel works better for file transfers, where the delivered data must be error-free but latency (time delay) incurred by the retransmission of error-containing packets is acceptable.

Consumer-oriented ADSL was designed to operate on existing lines already conditioned for Basic Rate Interface ISDN services. Engineers developed high-speed DSL facilities such as high bit rate digital subscriber line (HDSL) and symmetric digital subscriber line (SDSL) to provision traditional Digital Signal 1 (DS1) services over standard copper pair facilities.

Older ADSL standards delivered 8 Mbit/s to the customer over about 2 km (1.2 mi) of unshielded twisted-pair copper wire. Newer variants improved these rates. Distances greater than 2 km (1.2 mi) significantly reduce the bandwidth usable on the wires, thus reducing the data rate. But ADSL loop extenders increase these distances by repeating the signal, allowing the local exchange carrier (LEC) to deliver DSL speeds to any distance.

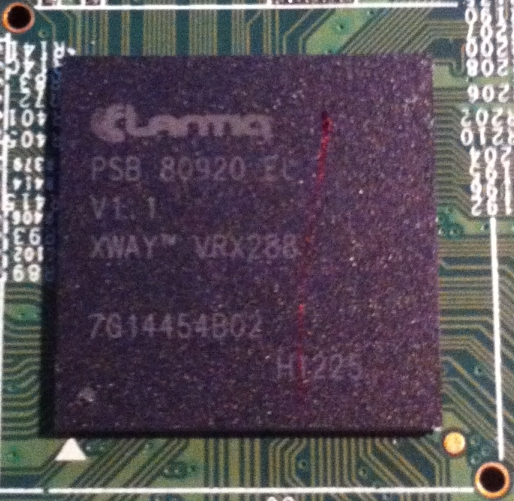
DSL SoC

Until the late 1990s, the cost of digital signal processors for DSL was prohibitive. All types of DSL employ highly complex digital signal processing algorithms to overcome the inherent limitations of the existing twisted pair wires. Due to the advancements of very-large-scale integration (VLSI) technology, the cost of the equipment associated with a DSL deployment lowered significantly. The two main pieces of equipment are a digital subscriber line access multiplexer (DSLAM) at one end and a DSL modem at the other end.

It is possible to set up a DSL connection over an existing cable. Such deployment, even including equipment, is much cheaper than installing a new, high-bandwidth fiber-optic cable over the same route and distance. This is true both for ADSL and SDSL variations. DSL's continued use reflects advancements in electronics that have improved performance and reduced costs, despite the high expense of laying new physical infrastructure.

These advantages made ADSL a better proposition for customers requiring Internet access than metered dial up, while also allowing voice calls to be received at the same time as a data connection. Telephone companies were also under pressure to move to ADSL owing to competition from cable companies, which use DOCSIS cable modem technology to achieve similar speeds. Demand for high bandwidth applications, such as video and file sharing, also contributed to the popularity of ADSL technology. Some of the first field trials for DSL were carried out in 1996.

Early DSL service required a dedicated dry loop, but when the U.S. Federal Communications Commission (FCC) required incumbent local exchange carriers (ILECs) to lease their lines to competing DSL service providers, shared-line DSL became available. Also known as DSL over unbundled network element, this unbundling of services allows a single subscriber to receive two separate services from two separate providers on one cable pair. The DSL service provider's equipment is co-located in the same telephone exchange as that of the ILEC supplying the customer's pre-existing voice service. The subscriber's circuit is rewired to interface with hardware supplied by the ILEC which combines a DSL frequency and plain old telephone service (POTS) signals on a single copper pair.

Since 1999, certain ISPs have been offering microfilters. These devices are installed indoors and serve the same purpose as DSL splitters, which are deployed outdoors: they divide the frequencies needed for ADSL and POTS phone calls. These filters originated out of a desire to make self-installation of DSL service possible and eliminate early outdoor DSL splitters which were installed at or near the demarcation point between the customer and the ISP.

By 2012, some carriers in the United States reported that DSL remote terminals with fiber backhaul were replacing older ADSL systems.

== Operation ==
Telephones are connected to the telephone exchange via a local loop, which is a physical pair of wires. The local loop was originally intended mostly for the transmission of speech, encompassing an audio frequency range of 300 to 3400 hertz (commercial bandwidth). However, as long-distance trunks were gradually converted from analog to digital operation, the idea of being able to pass data through the local loop (by using frequencies above the voiceband) took hold, ultimately leading to DSL.

The local loop connecting the telephone exchange to most subscribers has the capability of carrying frequencies well beyond the 3400 Hz upper limit of POTS. Depending on the length and quality of the loop, the upper limit can be tens of megahertz. DSL takes advantage of this unused bandwidth of the local loop by creating 4312.5 Hz wide channels starting between 10 and 100 kHz, depending on how the system is configured. Allocation of channels continues to higher frequencies (up to 1.1 MHz for ADSL) until new channels are deemed unusable. Each channel is evaluated for usability in much the same way an analog modem would on a POTS connection. More usable channels equate to more available bandwidth, which is why distance and line quality are a factor (the higher frequencies used by DSL travel only short distances).

The pool of usable channels is then split into two different frequency bands for upstream and downstream traffic, based on a preconfigured ratio. This segregation reduces interference. Once the channel groups have been established, the individual channels are bonded into a pair of virtual circuits, one in each direction. Like analog modems, DSL transceivers constantly monitor the quality of each channel and will add or remove them from service depending on whether they are usable. Once upstream and downstream circuits are established, a subscriber can connect to a service such as an Internet service provider or other network services, like a corporate MPLS network.

The underlying technology of transport across DSL facilities uses modulation of high-frequency carrier waves, an analog signal transmission. A DSL circuit terminates at each end in a modem which modulates patterns of bits into certain high-frequency impulses for transmission to the opposing modem. Signals received from the far-end modem are demodulated to yield a corresponding bit pattern that the modem passes on, in digital form, to its interfaced equipment, such as a computer, router, switch, etc.

Unlike traditional dial-up modems, which modulate bits into signals in the 300–3400 Hz audio baseband, DSL modems modulate frequencies from 4000 Hz to as high as 4 MHz. This frequency band separation enables DSL service and plain old telephone service (POTS) to coexist on the same cables, known as voice-grade cables. On the subscriber's end of the circuit, inline DSL filters are installed on each telephone to pass voice frequencies but filter the high-frequency signals that would otherwise be heard as hiss. Also, nonlinear elements in the phone could otherwise generate audible intermodulation and may impair the operation of the data modem in the absence of these low-pass filters. DSL and RADSL modulations do not use the voice-frequency band so high-pass filters are incorporated in the circuitry of DSL modems to filter out voice frequencies.

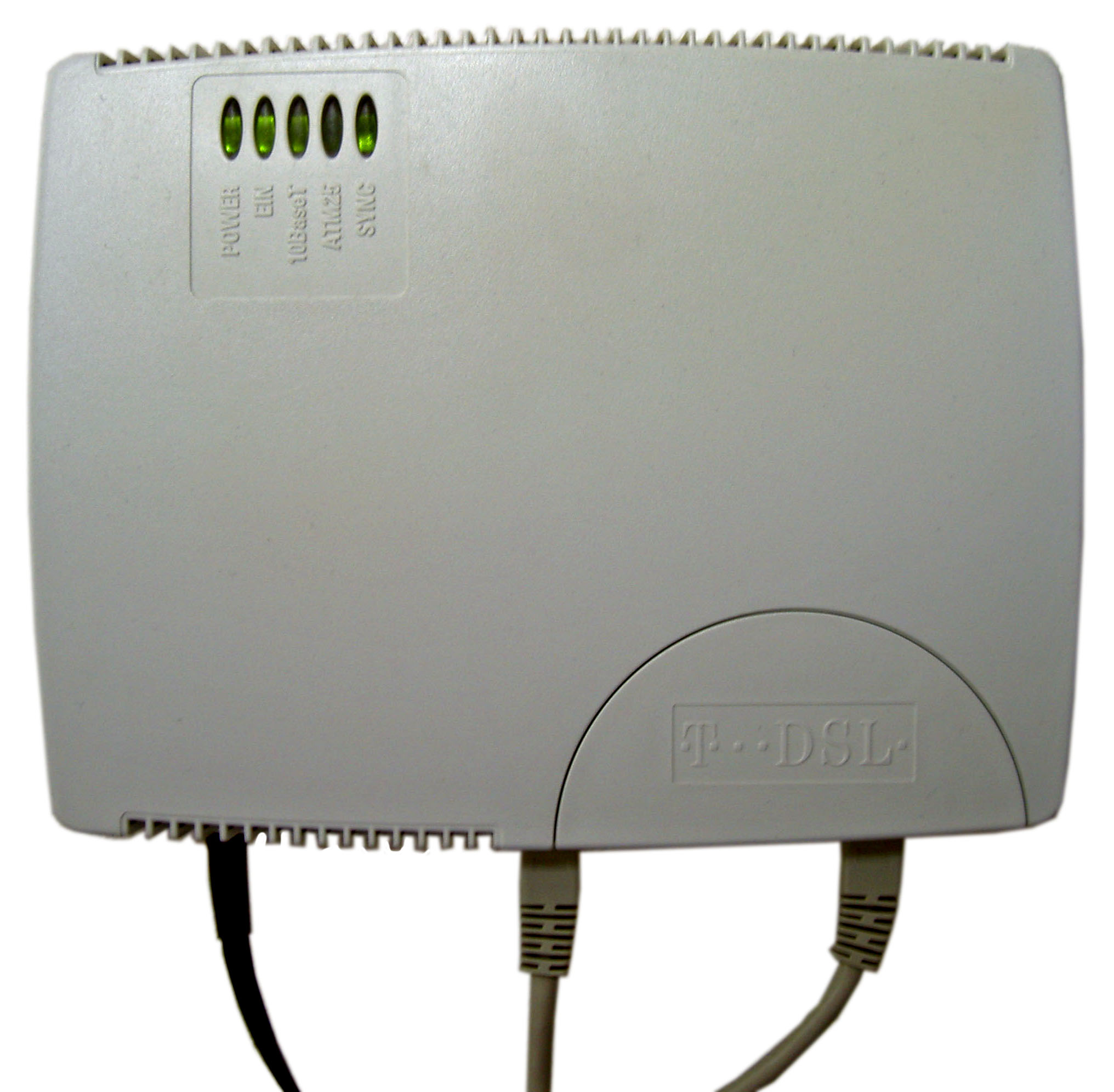
A DSL modem

Because DSL operates above the 3.4 kHz voice limit, it cannot pass through a loading coil, which is an inductive coil that is designed to counteract loss caused by shunt capacitance (capacitance between the two wires of the twisted pair). Loading coils are commonly set at regular intervals in POTS lines. Voice service cannot be maintained past a certain distance without such coils. Therefore, some areas that are within range for DSL service are disqualified from eligibility because of loading coil placement. Because of this, phone companies endeavor to remove loading coils on copper loops that can operate without them. Longer lines that require them can be replaced with fiber to the neighborhood or node (FTTN).

Most residential and small-office DSL implementations reserve low frequencies for POTS, so that (with suitable filters and/or splitters) the existing voice service continues to operate independently of the DSL service. Thus POTS-based communications, including fax machines and dial-up modems, can share the wires with DSL. Only one DSL modem can use the subscriber line at a time. The standard way to let multiple computers share a DSL connection uses a router that establishes a connection between the DSL modem and a local Ethernet, powerline, or Wi-Fi network on the customer's premises.

The theoretical foundations of DSL, like much of communication technology, can be traced back to Claude Shannon's seminal 1948 paper, "A Mathematical Theory of Communication". Generally, higher bit rate transmissions require a wider frequency band, though the ratio of bit rate to symbol rate and thus to bandwidth are not linear due to significant innovations in digital signal processing and digital modulation methods.

=== Naked DSL ===
Naked DSL is a way of providing only DSL services over a local loop. It is useful when the customer does not need the traditional telephony voice service because voice service is received either on top of the DSL services (usually VoIP) or through another network (e.g., mobile telephony). It is also commonly called an unbundled network element (UNE) in the United States; in Australia it is known as an unconditioned local loop (ULL); in Belgium it is known as "raw copper" and in the UK it is known as Single Order GEA (SoGEA).

It started making a comeback in the United States in 2004 when Qwest started offering it, closely followed by Speakeasy. As a result of AT&T's merger with SBC, and Verizon's merger with MCI, those telephone companies have an obligation to offer naked DSL to consumers.

== Typical setup ==
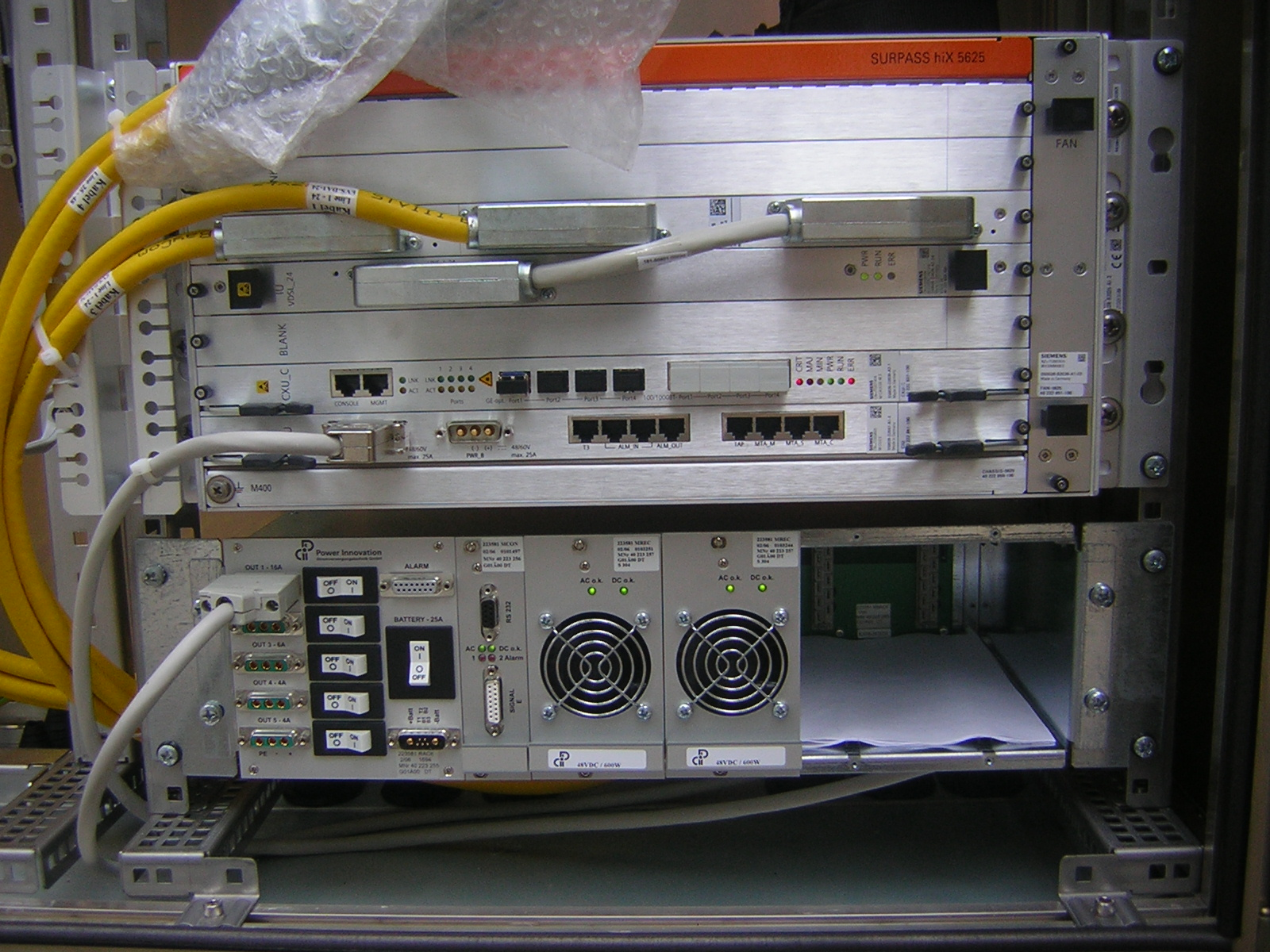
Example of a DSLAM from 2006

On the customer side, a DSL modem is hooked up to a phone line. The telephone company connects the other end of the line to a DSLAM (digital subscriber line access multiplexer), which concentrates a large number of individual DSL connections into a single box. The DSLAM cannot be located too far from the customer because of attenuation between the DSLAM and the user's DSL modem. It is common for a few residential blocks to be connected to one DSLAM.

DSL Connection schematic

The above figure is a schematic of a simple DSL connection (in blue). The right side shows a DSLAM residing in the telephone company's telephone exchange. The left side shows the customer premises equipment with an optional router. The router manages a local area network which connects PCs and other local devices. The customer may opt for a modem that contains both a router and wireless access. This option (within the dashed bubble) often simplifies the connection.

=== Exchange equipment ===
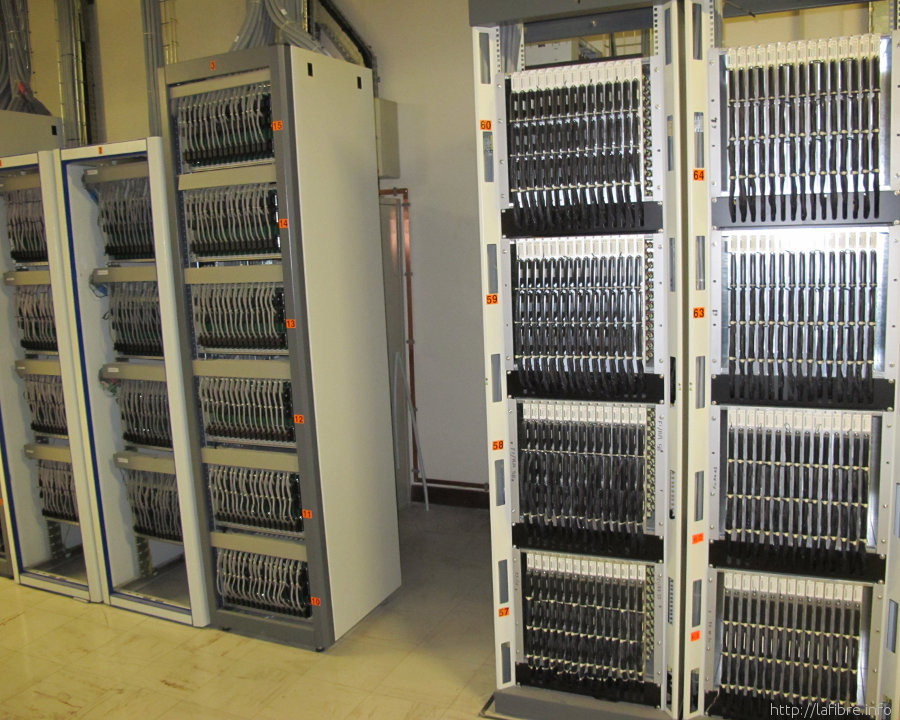
Older stand-alone ADSL filter and splitter banks at a telephone exchange

At the exchange, a DSLAM terminates the DSL circuits and aggregates them, where they are handed off to other networking transports such as a PON network or Ethernet. The DSLAM terminates all connections and recovers the original digital information. In the case of ADSL, the voice component is also separated at this step, either by a filter or splitter integrated in the DSLAM or by specialized filtering equipment installed before it. Load coils in phone lines, used for extending their range in rural areas, must be removed to allow DSL to operate as they only allow frequencies of up to 4000 Hz to pass through phone cables.

=== Customer equipment ===
DSL Modem schematic

The customer end of the connection consists of a DSL modem. This converts data between the digital signals used by computers and the analog voltage signal of a suitable frequency range which is then applied to the phone line.

In some DSL variations (for example, HDSL), the modem connects directly to the computer via a serial interface, using protocols such as Ethernet or V.35. In other cases (particularly ADSL), it is common for the customer equipment to be integrated with higher-level functionality, such as routing, firewalling, or other application-specific hardware and software. In this case, the equipment is referred to as a gateway.

Most DSL technologies require the installation of appropriate DSL filters at the customer's premises to separate the DSL signal from the low-frequency voice signal. The separation can take place either at the demarcation point, or with filters installed at the telephone outlets inside the customer premises. It is possible for a DSL gateway to integrate the filter, and allow telephones to connect through the gateway.

Modern DSL gateways often integrate routing and other functionality. The system boots, synchronizes the DSL connection and finally establishes the internet IP services and connection between the local network and the service provider, using protocols such as DHCP or PPPoE.

== Protocols and configurations ==
Many DSL technologies implement an Asynchronous Transfer Mode (ATM) layer over the low-level bitstream layer to enable the adaptation of a number of different technologies over the same link.

DSL implementations may create bridged or routed networks. In a bridged configuration, the group of subscriber computers effectively connect into a single subnetwork. The earliest implementations used DHCP to provide the IP address to the subscriber equipment, with authentication via MAC address or an assigned hostname. Later implementations often use Point-to-Point Protocol (PPP) to authenticate with a user ID and password.

== Transmission modulation methods ==
Transmission methods vary by market, region, carrier, and equipment.

- Discrete multitone modulation (DMT), the most common kind, also known as Orthogonal frequency-division multiplexing (OFDM)
- Trellis-coded pulse-amplitude modulation (TC-PAM), used for HDSL2 and SHDSL
- Carrierless amplitude phase modulation (CAP), deprecated in 1996 for ADSL, used for HDSL
- Two-binary, one-quaternary (2B1Q), used for IDSL and HDSL

== DSL technologies ==
DSL standards
Full name	Abbreviation	ITU-T standard	Date
Asymmetric digital subscriber line	ADSL	G.992.1 (G.dmt)	1999
Asymmetric digital subscriber line	ADSL2	G.992.3 (G.dmt.bis)	2002
Asymmetric digital subscriber line	ADSL2plus	G.992.5	2003
Asymmetric digital subscriber line-Reach Extended	ADSL2-RE	G.992.3	2003
Single-pair high-speed digital subscriber line	SHDSL	G.991.2	2003
Very-high-bit-rate digital subscriber line	VDSL	G.993.1	2004
Very-high-bit-rate digital subscriber line	VDSL2 -12 MHz long reach	G.993.2	2005
Very-high-bit-rate digital subscriber line	VDSL2 -30 MHz short reach	G.993.2	2005

DSL technologies (sometimes collectively summarized as xDSL) include:

- Symmetric digital subscriber line (SDSL), umbrella term for xDSL where the bitrate is equal in both directions.
  - ISDN digital subscriber line (IDSL), ISDN-based technology that provides a bitrate equivalent to two ISDN bearer and one data channel, 144 kbit/s symmetric over one pair
  - High-bit-rate digital subscriber line (HDSL), ITU-T G.991.1, the first DSL technology that used a higher frequency spectrum than ISDN, 1,544 kbit/s and 2,048 kbit/s symmetric services, either on 2 or 3 pairs at 784 kbit/s each, 2 pairs at 1,168 kbit/s each, or one pair at 2,320 kbit/s
  - High-bit-rate digital subscriber line 2/4 (HDSL2, HDSL4), ANSI, 1,544 kbit/s symmetric over one pair (HDSL2) or two pairs (HDSL4)
  - Symmetric digital subscriber line (SDSL), specific proprietary technology, up to 1,544 kbit/s symmetric over one pair
  - Single-pair high-speed digital subscriber line (G.SHDSL), ITU-T G.991.2, standardized successor of HDSL and proprietary SDSL, up to 5,696 kbit/s per pair, up to four pairs
- Asymmetric digital subscriber line (ADSL), umbrella term for xDSL where the bitrate is greater in one direction than the other.
  - ANSI T1.413 Issue 2, up to 8 Mbit/s and 1 Mbit/s
  - G.dmt, ITU-T G.992.1, up to 10 Mbit/s and 1 Mbit/s
  - G.lite, ITU-T G.992.2, more noise and attenuation resistant than G.dmt, up to 1,536 kbit/s and 512 kbit/s
  - Asymmetric digital subscriber line 2 (ADSL2), ITU-T G.992.3, up to 12 Mbit/s and 3.5 Mbit/s
  - Asymmetric digital subscriber line 2 plus (ADSL2+), ITU-T G.992.5, up to 24 Mbit/s and 3.5 Mbit/s
  - Very-high-bit-rate digital subscriber line (VDSL), ITU-T G.993.1, up to 52 Mbit/s and 16 Mbit/s
  - Very-high-bit-rate digital subscriber line 2 (VDSL2), ITU-T G.993.2, an improved version of VDSL, compatible with ADSL2+, sum of both directions up to 200 Mbit/s. G.vector crosstalk cancelling feature (ITU-T G.993.5) can be used to increase range at a given bitrate, e.g. 100 Mbit/s at up to 500 meters.
  - G.fast, ITU-T G.9700 and G.9701, up to approximately 1 Gbit/s aggregate uplink and downlink at 100m. Approved in December 2014, deployments planned for 2016.
  - XG-FAST, allows for up to 10 Gbit/s on copper twisted pair lines, but only for lengths up to 30 meters. Real-world tests have shown 8 Gbit/s on 30-meter long twisted pair lines.
- Bonded DSL Rings (DSL Rings), a shared ring topology at 400 Mbit/s
- Cable/DSL gateway
- Etherloop Ethernet local loop
- High-speed voice and data link
- Rate-Adaptive Digital Subscriber Line (RADSL), designed to increase range and noise tolerance by sacrificing upstream speed
- Uni-DSL (Uni digital subscriber line or UDSL), technology developed by Texas Instruments, backward compatible with all DMT standards
- Hybrid Access Networks combine existing xDSL deployments with a wireless network such as LTE to increase bandwidth and quality of experience by balancing the traffic over the two access networks.

The line-length limitations from telephone exchange to subscriber impose severe limits on data transmission rates. Technologies such as VDSL provide very high-speed but short-range links. VDSL is used as a method of delivering triple play services (typically implemented in fiber to the curb network architectures).

Terabit DSL, is a technology that proposes the use of the space between the dielectrics (insulators) on copper twisted pair lines in telephone cables, as waveguides for 300 GHz signals that can offer speeds of up to 1 terabit per second at distances of up to 100 meters, 100 gigabits per second for 300 meters, and 10 gigabits per second for 500 meters. The first experiment for this was carried out with copper lines that were parallel to each other, and not twisted, inside a metal pipe meant to simulate the metal armoring in large telephone cables.

== See also ==
- Dynamic spectrum management (DSM)
- John Cioffi – Known as "the father of DSL"
- List of countries by number of Internet users
- List of interface bit rates
