= ADSL loop extender =

Telecommunications device

A DSL loop extender is a device that a telephone company can place between subscriber premises equipment and central office interfaces to extend the distance and increase the channel capacity of digital subscriber line (DSL) connections. ADSL repeaters are deployed by rural telephone companies trying to provide rural Internet service to farms and small towns where it is impractical to place the DSLAM closer to the subscriber. Typical distance improvements with a loop extender are shown in the diagram below, with rate in megabits per second and distance in thousands of feet.

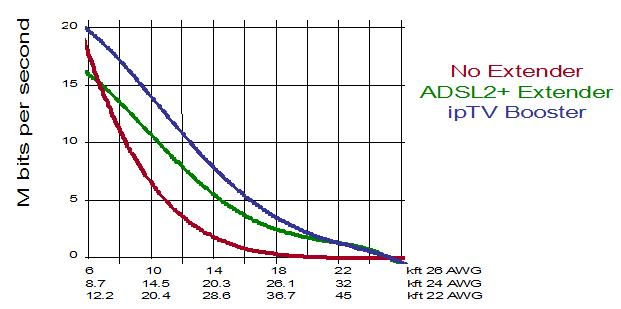

Multiple loop extenders can be placed on a line, effectively making the reach of the ADSL signal infinite. That is, it is possible to reach any subscriber with any ADSL speed if one uses multiple loop extenders.

A repeater can either be an amplifier or a re-generator. Amplifiers increase the signal level of the analog transmission signal; re-generators demodulate the signal to binary, then re-modulate it into the original transmission frequency. Because regeneration restores the signal to binary, an indefinite number of re-generators can be placed on a line and is the preferred choice for services like T1 (Digital Signal 1) that have no distance limits. Because of the simplicity of the amplifier circuits, amplifiers are of lower cost than re-generators.

Before the development of ADSL loop extenders and remote DSLAMs, ADSL was limited to 3–6 miles (5–10 km) from the Central Office depending on the wire gauge used. An ADSL Loop Extender works as an amplifier, boosting the signal level so it can travel longer distances. In some cases, service can now be established as far as 10 miles from the Central Office.

In 2006, US telco promoted Fiber to the Home. This was driven by a rapidly growing housing sector that was creating the "greenfield" customers that are needed to make fiber to the home profitable. Later, with the housing sector in a serious recession, that "greenfield" seems to be drying up fast. With most of the "brownfield" market already tapped for ADSL, Telcos finally are interested in extending ADSL to those semi-rural areas that have never been important before.

In 2010, the US Federal Government updated the subsidies paid to rural telephone companies so that broadband is subsidized rather than phone service in a program called Connect America Fund. In order to qualify for subsidy, the telephone company must provide 4 mbits downstream and 1 mbit upstream. This has increased the demand for ADSL loop extenders because loop extenders will allow the telephone companies to reach the most distant subscribers in a way that is more cost effective than deploying remote DSLAMs.

Some ADSL loop extenders aren't repeaters, but instead convert to a different signal (like G.shdsl) that fares better over extreme distances. This is because G.shdsl can use the lower frequencies that ADSL reserved for voice use.

Crosstalk has been analyzed using T1.417 Method B and found to be compliant. Since the objective is to provide DSL to locations where no other data service can reach, or is needed (e.g. onto a farm), and ordinary telephone service is very immune to cross talk from ADSL due to ADSL not using voice frequency range, the cross talk issue is further reduced. Converting to G.shdsl or other technologies has problems too. These technologies have limited downstream speed, thus are less useful except to extend services to the most distant customers. Their many components (special C.O., re-generators, CPE) make them more expensive than ADSL amplifiers.
