= Naked DSL =

Digital subscriber line without PSTN service

A naked DSL, also known as standalone or dry loop DSL, is a digital subscriber line (DSL) without a PSTN (analogue telephony) service — or the associated dial tone. In other words, only a standalone DSL Internet service is provided on the local loop.

The original concept of DSL was to use existing telephone lines for high speed data communication, with DSL and telephone services coexisting on the same phone line - but increasingly customers may require only the Internet service - and see no need for the traditional phone service.

== Comparison of Regular and Naked DSL (Standalone DSL) ==
In Regular DSL, data transmission is carried on inaudible high frequencies on a standard Plain Old Telephone Service (POTS) telephone line.

The original idea was to use existing telephone lines for high speed data communication. DSL and telephone service can coexist on the same phone line and do not interfere with each other. From the Telco's point of view, DSL gives them the ability to sell the same telephone line twice, to the same customer. It is an idea that benefits the telco (who makes more money) and the customer (who gets a high speed data connection without the need for installation of expensive new cables.)

Naked DSL is the same as standard DSL, except that there is no voice service. Telephone service is not required for DSL to operate correctly.

The primary advantage of Naked DSL is financial: the customer saves the expense of a phone line, which they may not need. In terms of equipment, physical setup and speed, there is no difference between Naked DSL and Regular DSL. They are identical, except for the absence of dial tone.

Telco Response to standalone DSL has generally been hostile.

In the United States AT&T allows Standalone DSL for its own customers, but only very reluctantly, and it blocks third parties from providing Standalone DSL over AT&T telephone lines unless those customers also purchase AT&T branded voice services. Verizon stopped permitting Standalone DSL for its own customers in 2014, but some third parties such as Brand X Internet do still offer it. Verizon's own customers are required to buy Verizon branded voice services in order to purchase any kind of DSL.

In regular DSL, a cable runs from the telephone switch to a piece of equipment called a Plain Old Telephone Service (POTS) splitter. This splitter separates the DSL and voice bands. Thus the customer will have a dial tone, which allows them to use the telephone line as a regular land line while they are using it to access the Internet on their computer. A cable carrying both services runs from the splitter to the cable head, where it continues on to the customer on outside plant. (See DSLAM.)

In naked DSL, there is no cable from the telephone switch to the POTS splitter. Thus there is no dial tone on the line. However, the customer could still use the line for regular telephone service through Voice over Internet Protocol (VoIP) or a Competitive Local Exchange Carrier (CLEC) instead of the Incumbent Local Exchange Carrier (ILEC).

Naked ADSL2 and ADSL2+ provisioned with "all digital mode" Annex I or Annex J can achieve additional 256 kbit/s of upstream data rate.

== Availability ==
Naked DSL is available in several countries, if not nationwide then via at least one company: Austria, Australia, Belgium, Bulgaria, Canada, Croatia, Denmark, Estonia, France, Germany, Israel, Italy, the Netherlands, New Zealand, Norway, Philippines, Portugal, Sweden, Switzerland, Turkey and the United States.

=== Australia ===
Amnet was the first ISP in Australia to officially launch a naked DSL product live on 14 November 2007, followed by iiNet a day later. Exetel released naked ADSL2 Services on 1 December 2007. Optus, Australia's second largest telecommunications provider, announced on 2 Mar 2009 that it will also be providing naked DSL services. Other providers include offer Naked DSL are listed at Updated List of Naked DSL ISPs that service Australia.

Many of the smaller players use Optus to deliver their Naked DSL services.

=== Canada ===
Since the CRTC ruling of 21 July 2003, Naked DSL service has been made available in Canada. Bell Canada and other incumbents typically charge an additional fee for dry loop DSL based on the "Band Rate" of the area (ranging from Band A to Band G) to consumers and smaller ISP's who use Bell's phone line.

=== Croatia ===
Several providers offer naked DSL, but as of late July 2012, Iskon Internet is the first one to offer naked DSL nationwide on T-Hrvatski Telekom's existing infrastructure, by unsubscribing from T-Com's analog line and providing telephony service over VoIP. However, due to T-HT's wholesale policy and prices, higher speeds would be too expensive for end user, and DSL link still operates in Annex B.

=== Denmark ===
Naked DSL is available from the majority of ISPs, as most ISPs have now converted to VoIP solutions. Having 2 different providers for both POTS and DSL is possible.

=== France ===
Several ISPs now offer Naked Unbundled DSL services, which are also called offres dégroupées. ISPs generally supply their own DSL modem with an FXS (Foreign exchange station) port for a standard phone handset and a set top box to provide television services.

The first ISP to offer Naked DSL was Free with their Freebox.

=== Germany ===
At least one ISP offers Naked DSL service: M-Net and its version, Maxi Pur.

=== Israel ===
Naked DSL (both ADSL and VDSL) is provided by Bezeq telephony company to customers upon request, since most homes use both telephony and DSL lines as default, the service is provided only by demand. It's possible to request to remove the telephony line function at any given time without any restrictions or obligations.

=== New Zealand ===
Chorus Limited is the wholesale provider for the vast majority of phone lines and it provides naked DSL services. All the major internet retailers provide a naked DSL service. It is possible to get the POTS and DSL from different service providers. As of December 2013, Chorus provides 1.091 million ADSL2+ connections, of which 98,000 (9%) are naked, and it has 25,000 VDSL2 connections, of which 5,000 (20%) are naked.

=== Paraguay ===
Naked DSL service is available in Paraguay from State owned COPACO

=== Philippines ===
Bayan Telecommunications, Globe Telecom, EASTERN Communications, and Smart Telecommunications offers that service.

=== Portugal ===
Portugal Telecom offers that service, called Naked, since September 2008 through SAPO (company).

Simplesnet offers that service, called NDSL Simplesnet.

In May 2008, Zon TvCabo announced to its investors that it will offer Portugal's first Naked DSL service.

=== South Africa ===
Naked DSL services have started to become available in South Africa as alternatives to uncapped fiber. Various companies have started to provide the service due to high prices of uncapped fiber.

=== Switzerland ===
Naked DSL service is available in Switzerland from solnet.ch (DSL Solo), green.ch, origon ag (oDSL), INIT7 AG and many more for VDSL and g.fast.

Swisscom (The operator of the POTS infrastructure) has started to shut down POTS beginning in 2018 and was moving all customers to other solutions (Mainly VoIP, but also mobile services). Therefore, naked DSL is now the default product, many providers like iWay and solnet.ch are also selling bundled service with VoIP (usually integrated into the router).

=== Thailand ===
Only 3BB offer Naked DSL service. 3BB is former Maxnet who previously offer this service too.

=== Turkey ===
In 2011, the regulatory body of Turkish State foreseeing telecommunications have announced whole-sale pricing for government corporation Turk Telekom for providing retailers with Naked DSL. The pricing included additional fees under various labels, such as circuit preparation service (Turkish: Devre hazırlama ücreti) or an additional naked DSL fee (Turkish: Yalın ADSL ücreti). Although circuit preparation service fee is one-time, the latter is fixed and can take as much as %20 of the monthly bill. The additional costs was heavily criticized by consumers, as the very slight difference between ADSL+Voice (over fixed-lines) and Naked DSL services has made the latter financially irrelevant. As of 2015, all major broadband retailers offer Naked ADSL service to consumers.

=== United Kingdom ===
Naked DSL service, excluding SDSL, is not widely available in the United Kingdom, but it is possible to get a POTS and DSL from different service providers.. The incumbent network operator, BT plc, have previously claimed there was not sufficient demand from ISPs to provide a Naked DSL service. Openreach are currently trialing a product called SOGEA (Single Order Generic Ethernet Access) which is a VDSL2 Profile 17a service without POTS. Additionally a third party ISP in the UK (LLU) can use SLU (Sub Loop Unbundling) to situate their own external cabinets in the Local Network with xDSL/Optical muxing hardware commonly known as MSANs. Virgin Media provides broadband services without the requirement for a telephone line in HFC cabled areas only, but this is not naked DSL as the service is provided via a coaxial cable using DOCSIS from the street, rather that over a telephone line, active or otherwise. Some ISPs can provide a copper pair (with no telephone service) as part of their DSL package.

In December 2018 BT Openreach announced that they would close down the old PSTN services with a phased approach between 2019 and December 2025. SOGEA is due to replace all PSTN services.

=== United States ===
On March 25, 2005, the Federal Communications Commission (FCC) ruled 3-2 against utilities commissions in Florida, Georgia, Kentucky, and Louisiana, which wanted to force BellSouth to unbundle their DSL service from their local phone service. However, in that proceeding, as a compromise between the FCC Commissioners, the FCC released a Notice of Inquiry requesting comment on the "competitive consequences when providers bundle their legacy services with new services, or "tie" such services together"; that proceeding remains open before the FCC. Later that year, during merger proceedings, the FCC required Verizon and AT&T Inc. to offer naked-DSL for a period of two years as conditions to mergers; those conditions have since expired.

AT&T Inc. now provides naked DSL throughout most of the country, and Qwest Communications provides it voluntarily. Verizon Communications also provides it in some areas, although at a higher price than it charges customers who bundle it with regular phone service. Speakeasy also provides this service.

Brand X Internet, a California-based Internet provider, offers naked DSL throughout Verizon territories in California, New York, and a number of other states where Verizon dry loop lines are available. Verizon does not connect dry loop lines to a phone jack, so customers must arrange to have the dry loop line connected to a jack in their office or home.

For Missouri, Socket Telecom Holds a high rate of customers in the NDSL Range.

== See also ==
- Local loop unbundling
- Alarm circuit
