= Permitted attached private lines =

Permitted attached private lines, abbreviated PAPL, are voice-grade telephone wires that run point-to-point (rather than point-to-exchange) between locations in the telephone company's copper network. Data can travel across the PAPL link (at a distance of up to 3.5 km) at speeds of around 2Mb per second. Originally, PAPLs were intended to act as basic alarm circuits for fire or security systems, though in recent years have been utilised to carry DSL data signals.
