= Highway 1 (ISP) =

Australian Internet service provider

Highway 1 (Aust) Pty Ltd
- Company type: Private
- Industry: Internet service provider Telecommunications
- Founded: Perth, Western Australia (1994)
- Defunct: 2012
- Fate: Acquired by Zetta Group, now known as Zettagrid
- Successor: Zettagrid
- Headquarters: Perth, Western Australia
- Key people: Nicholas Power, COO; Nathan Harman, CEO
- Products: Broadband; Metro Ethernet; 4G wireless Telephony; Colocation
- Number of employees: 35
- Parent: Zettagrid Holdings Pty Ltd
- Website: www.Highway1.com.au

Highway 1 was an Internet service provider (ISPs) in Australia, established in 1994. In 2012, following the acquisition and integration of Global Dial, Highway 1 was renamed to ZettaNet Pty Ltd and then merged into Zettagrid Pty Ltd in 2024.

== History ==
Highway 1 was established in 1994 as an Internet service provider (ISP) based in Perth, Western Australia. It commencement of 56K Dialup services in 1997 and acquired Perth Internet Services Provider (IAP) divesting IAP's Kalgoorlie based assets to Gold.net.au. It commencement of ADSL services in 2000. In 2007 the introduction of Naked DSL services through the use of Optus Unbundled Local Loop Technology. Highway 1 acquired by ZettaServe Pty Ltd in 2007. Board and management are replaced. The company continues to operate as a standalone entity.

In 2009 Highway 1 was selected by the Department of Broadband, Communications and the Digital Economy to participate the ISP Live Filtering Trial.

In 2010 it acquired web hosting company APIIX, VOIP and softPBX company Simtex, and acquired DSL providers Worldwide Internet, EON Technology, Nerdnet Internet], and Global Dial.

Highway 1 was renamed ZettaNet on 1 August 2012.

ZettaNet was merged into Zettagrid Pty Ltd on 28 March 2024.
