= Single-pair =

Single-pair may refer to:

- Single-pair high-speed digital subscriber line, a data communications technology
- Single-pair shortest-path problem, the problem of finding a path between two vertices such that the sum of the weights of its constituent edges is minimized
