= Gigapackets =

Gigapackets are billions (10^{9}) of packets or datagrams. The packet is the fundamental unit of information in computer networks.

Data transfer rates in gigapackets per second are associated with high speed networks, especially fiber optic networks. The bit rates that are used to create gigapackets are in the range of gigabits per second. These rates are seen in network speeds of gigabit Ethernet or 10 Gigabit Ethernet and SONET Optical Carrier rates of OC-48 at 2.5 Gbit/s and OC-192 at 10 Gbit/s.
