= TC-PAM =

Modulation format used in HDSL2 and G.SHDSL

Trellis-coded pulse-amplitude modulation (TC-PAM) is the modulation format that is used in HDSL2 and G.SHDSL. It is a variant of trellis coded modulation (TCM) which uses a one-dimensional pulse-amplitude modulation (PAM) symbol space, as opposed to a two-dimensional quadrature amplitude modulation (QAM) symbol space. Compared to the 2B1Q scheme used in the older HDSL and SDSL standards, TC-PAM improves range at a given bit-rate and provides enhanced spectral compatibility with ADSL.

TC-PAM is also known as 4B1H, because it uses 16 levels to represents a 4 digit binary, 4 Binary 1 Hexadecimal.
