= Brand X (disambiguation) =

Brand X is a jazz fusion band.

Brand X may also refer to:

== Film and television ==
- '"Brand X" (The X-Files), an episode of a television series
- Brand X with Russell Brand, a television series
- The antagonist organization from the 2012 movie Foodfight!

== Other uses ==
- 24th Special Tactics Squadron, a US Air Force unit originally referred to as "BRAND X"
- Brand X, a text-based computer game also known as Philosopher's Quest
- Brand X, a tabloid and blog site published by the Los Angeles Times
- Brand X Internet, an Internet Service Provider in Southern California
  - National Cable & Telecommunications Ass'n v. Brand X Internet Services, a US Supreme Court decision known as the Brand X case

== See also ==
- X Brands (1927–2000), actor
