= IDSL (disambiguation) =

IDSL is a four letter acronym that can stand for:

- International Day of Sign Languages
- ISDN digital subscriber line
- ID-SL, ISO 3166 code for Sulawesi
