= High-bit-rate digital subscriber line 2 =

High-bit-rate digital subscriber line 2 (HDSL2) is a standard developed by the American National Standards Institute (ANSI) Committee T1E1.4 and published in 2000 as ANSI T1.418-2000. Like its predecessor HDSL, HDSL2 provides a symmetric data rate of 1,544 kbit/s in both the upstream and downstream directions at a noise margin of 5-6 dB. Its primary purpose was also to provision a T-1 line, only this technology relies on fewer wires - two instead of four - and therefore costs less to set up. The modulation technique used in HDSL2 is TC-PAM, which is also used in G.SHDSL, as opposed to 2B1Q in HDSL. Spectral shaping is applied to increase compatibility with ADSL and HDSL2 on the same bundle. HDSL4 provides the same bitrate as HDSL2, but uses four wires instead of two, to increase robustness. On an AWG26 local loop, the reach of HDSL2 is 9,000 feet (2.7 km), while that of HDSL4 is 11,000 feet (3.4 km).
