= Dry loop =

Unconditioned leased pair of telephone line

A dry loop (or dry pair) is an unconditioned leased pair of telephone line from a telephone company. The pair does not provide dial tone or battery (continuous electric potential), as opposed to a wet pair, a line usually without dial tone but with battery.

A dry pair was originally used with security systems but more recently may also be used with digital subscriber line (DSL) service or an Ethernet extender to connect two locations, as opposed to a costlier means such as a Frame Relay. The pair in many cases goes through the local telephone exchange.

Wet pair naming comes from the battery used to sustain the loop, which was made from wet cells.

Many carriers market dry loops to independent DSL providers as a BANA for basic analog loop or in some locales PANA for plain analog loop, OPX (off-premises extension) line, paging circuit, or finally LADS (local area data service).

== Local availability ==
In the United States, these circuits typically incur a monthly recurring charge of $3.00 per ¼ mile (approximately), plus an additional handling fee of around ($5–10).

In Canada, a CRTC ruling as of 21 July 2003 requires telcos (such as Bell Canada) permit dry loop and some companies do provide this service. Naked DSL is currently provided by third-party DSL (digital subscriber line) vendors in the provinces of Ontario and Quebec, but incurs an additional dry loop fee (often $5 or more monthly, depending on the distance from the exchange). There is not yet widespread adoption, as this extra fee often renders dry-loop DSL more costly than comparable cable modem service in most locations. A Bell Canada "dry loop" DSL connection does supply battery, but the underlying phone line is non-functional except to call 958-ANAC (It may also be possible to call 9-1-1 or the 310-BELL telco business office on a dry loop, however many regions do not support this).

== See also ==
- Current loop
- Local-loop unbundling
- Naked DSL
- Permitted attached private lines
