= High-bit-rate digital subscriber line =

Telecommunications protocol

High-bit-rate digital subscriber line (HDSL) is a telecommunications protocol standardized in 1994. It was the first digital subscriber line (DSL) technology to use a higher frequency spectrum over copper, twisted pair cables. HDSL was developed to transport DS1 services at 1.544 Mbit/s and 2.048 Mbit/s over telephone local loops without a need for repeaters. Successor technology to HDSL includes HDSL2 and HDSL4, proprietary SDSL, and G.SHDSL.

== Standardization ==
HDSL was developed for T1 service at 1.544 Mbit/s by the American National Standards Institute (ANSI) Committee T1E1.4 and published in February 1994 as ANSI Technical Report TR-28. This American variant uses two wire pairs with at a rate of 784 kbit/s each, using the 2B1Q line code, which is also used in the American variant of the ISDN U interface. First products were developed in 1993. A European version of the standard for E1 service at 2.048 Mbit/s was published in February 1995 by the European Telecommunications Standards Institute (ETSI) as ETSI ETR 152. The first edition of ETR 152 specified the line code 2B1Q on either three pairs at 784 kbit/s each or two pairs at 1,168 kbit/s each. A second edition of ETR 152, published in June 1995, specified trellis coded carrierless amplitude/phase modulation (CAP) as an alternative modulation scheme, running on two pairs at 1,168 kbit/s each. A third version of ETR 152, published in December 1996, added the possibility of using a single CAP-modulated pair at 2,320 kbit/s. Later, an international HDSL standard was published by Study Group 15 of the Telecommunication Standardization Sector of the International Telecommunication Union (ITU-T) on 26 August 1998 and adopted as recommendation ITU-T G.991.1 on 13 October 1998.

== Comparison to legacy T1 ==
Legacy T1 carriers operated using the alternate mark inversion (AMI) line code, more recently also B8ZS, on two wire pairs. Each wire pair was operated in simplex, that is, one wire pair was used for transmission in each direction. The Nyquist frequency of a 1.544 megabaud signal is 772 kHz. Higher frequencies are attenuated more strongly than lower frequencies, motivating the use of technologies that reduce the signal bandwidth. In HDSL, full duplex by means of echo cancellation is used, enabling simultaneous transmission in both directions on each of the two wire pairs, effectively reducing the symbol rate by a factor two. Through the use of 2B1Q encoding, two bits are combined to one symbol, further reducing the symbol rate by a factor of two. For this two-pair 2B1Q variant of HDSL, framing increases the bitrate from 1.544 Mbit/s to 1.568 Mbit/s, resulting in a symbol rate of 392 kilobaud and a Nyquist frequency of 196 kHz.

Legacy T1 required repeaters every 35 dB of attenuation, equivalent to 1 to 1.2 miles (1.6 to 1.9 km), depending on conductor gauge and other circumstances. Originally marketed as "non-repeated T1", HDSL increased the reach to 12,000 feet (3.7 km) on an AWG24 local loop. To enable longer HDSL lines, up to four repeaters can be used for a reach of 60,000 feet (18 km).

== Comparison to other DSL variants ==
Unlike ADSL, HDSL operates in the baseband and does not allow POTS and ISDN to coexist on the same wire pairs. Unlike ADSL, the proprietary SDSL, and G.SHDSL, HDSL is not rate adaptive: the line rate is always 1.544 Mbit/s or 2.048 Mbit/s. Lower rates at multiples of 64 kbit/s are offered to customers by using only a portion of the DS0 channels in the DS1 signal, referred to as channelized T1/E1.

HDSL gave way to new symmetric DSL technologies, HDSL2 and HDSL4, the proprietary SDSL, and G.SHDSL. HDSL2 offers the same data rate over a single pair of copper; it also offers longer reach, and can work over copper of lower gauge or quality. SDSL is a multi-rate technology, offering speeds ranging from 192 kbit/s to 2.3 Mbit/s, using a single pair of copper.
