= Commercial bandwidth =

Commercial bandwidth is a term for the regular capacity of the telephone network required for intelligible speech. It was defined as 300 to 3,400 hertz, although the modern PSTN is theoretically capable of transmitting from 0 to 7,000 Hz using ISDN.

== See also ==
- DS0
- Bandwidth (signal processing)
- Voice frequency
