= Brand X Internet =

Brand X Internet (or Brand X) is a local Internet service provider based in Marina del Rey/Santa Monica, California. It is best known for the United States Supreme Court decision in the case Brand X vs. FCC, later titled National Cable & Telecommunications Ass'n v. Brand X Internet Services.

It was founded as "Leonardo Internet" in 1994. Brand X Internet was formed in 1997 from those parts of Leonardo which were not sold to Verio in a transaction for which Leonardo's partners were never paid. This became a lawsuit which Verio eventually settled for $350,000.

Brand X started providing primarily dialup and T1 connections as well as websites, but when DSL technology became available, Brand X moved into this area too.

Brand X provides DSL and FTTH services to customers in Southern California.
