= DSL Rings =

Communication technology

DSL Rings (D.S.L.R.) is a telecommunications technology developed by Canadian start-up Genesis Technical Systems, based in Calgary, Canada. The DSL technology reuses existing copper telephone network cabling for a stated bandwidth of up to 50 Mb/s. The technology apparently includes quality of service (QoS) & efficient multicast, though that might not be entirely accurate.

Genesis reported that two unnamed European telecom providers began testing the technology in July 2010.

== Technical overview ==
DSL Rings technology combines the capabilities of VDSL2, DSL bonding, Resilient Packet Rings (RPR) technologies and add-drop multiplexers (ADM) in a collector ring instead of the historic tree and branch approach.

The links between the houses are implemented via passive jumper wires that do not come back to the Convergence Node (CN). Therefore, a single CN design can efficiently manage 2–16 houses in a given ring. Genesis suggests a maximum of 16 houses in the ring due to the delay introduced by transiting each node to get back to the central office (CO); however, RPR has an upper limit of 255 nodes per ring.

Bonded pairs are used to obtain maximum bandwidth from the CO to the pedestal (DP). The Convergence Node, which is environmentally hardened and powered via the copper wire from the CO, terminates the bonded signals and acts as the gateway node for the subscriber 'collector' ring. DSL Rings technology is based on the Resilient Packet Rings (RPR) protocol. The technology enables a fail-safe in that, if a single pair is cut, the traffic goes in the opposite direction around the ring to get to the network gateway node. RPR also provides built in quality of service (QoS) for traffic differentiation and managed services as well as an Efficient Multicast (EM) capability that significantly reduces overall ring bandwidth requirements for multicast/broadcast video.

Within the DSL Rings architecture the bonded link to the CO/Exchange, which is typically a binder group (20–25 pairs depending on the telco), is terminated at the pedestal where a ring is initiated. DSL Rings provides the capability to both terminate the bonded link from the CO and initiate another bonded link towards another pedestal down the road.
