= ISDN digital subscriber line =

ISDN Digital Subscriber Line (IDSL) uses ISDN-based digital subscriber line technology to provide a data communication channel across existing copper telephone lines at a rate of 144 kbit/s, slightly higher than a bonded dual channel ISDN connection at 128 kbit/s. The digital transmission bypasses the telephone company's central office equipment that handles analogue signals. IDSL uses the ISDN grade loop without Basic Rate Interface in ISDN transmission mode. The benefits of IDSL over ISDN are that IDSL provides always-on connections and transmits data via a data network rather than the carrier's voice network.

IDSL also avoids per-call fees by being generally billed at a flat-rate.

IDSL is not available in all countries.

ISDN digital subscriber line (IDSL) is a cross between ISDN and xDSL. It is like ISDN in that it uses a single-wire pair to transmit full-duplex data at 128 kbit/s and at distances of up to RRD range. Like ISDN, IDSL uses a 2B1Q line code to enable transparent operation through the ISDN U interface. Finally, the user continues to use existing CPE (ISDN BRI terminal adapters, bridges, and routers) to make the CO connections.

The big difference is from the carrier's point of view. Unlike ISDN, IDSL does not connect through the voice switch. A new piece of data communications equipment terminates the IDSL connection and shunts it off to a router or data switch. This is a key feature because the overloading of central office voice switches by data users is a growing problem for telcos.

The limitation of IDSL is that the customer no longer has access to ISDN signaling or voice services. But for Internet service providers, who do not provide a public voice service, IDSL is an alternative way of using POTS dial service to offer higher-speed Internet access, targeting the embedded base of more than five million ISDN users as an initial market.
