= Symmetric digital subscriber line =

Digital subscriber line that transmits digital data from the network to the subscriber

A symmetric digital subscriber line (SDSL) is a digital subscriber line (DSL) that transmits digital data over the copper wires of the telephone network, where the bandwidth in the downstream direction, from the network to the subscriber, is identical to the bandwidth in the upstream direction, from the subscriber to the network. This symmetric bandwidth can be considered to be the opposite of the asymmetric bandwidth offered by asymmetric digital subscriber line (ADSL) technologies, where the upstream bandwidth is lower than the downstream bandwidth. SDSL is generally marketed at business customers, while ADSL is marketed at private as well as business customers.

More specifically, SDSL can be understood as:

- In the wider sense, an umbrella term for all DSL variant which offer symmetric bandwidth, including IDSL, which offers 144 kbit/s, HDSL, HDSL2, G.SHDSL, which offers up to 22.784 Mbit/s over four pairs of copper wires, as well as the SDSL variant below
- In the narrow sense, a particular proprietary and non-standardized DSL variant for operation at 1.544 Mbit/s or 2.048 Mbit/s over a single pair of copper wires, without support for analog calls on the same line
- A term used by ETSI to refer to G.SHDSL

== Proprietary SDSL technology ==
SDSL is a rate-adaptive digital subscriber line (DSL) variant with T1/E1-like data rates (T1: 1.544 Mbit/s, E1: 2.048 Mbit/s). It runs over one pair of copper wires, with a maximum range of 10,000 feet (3,000 m). It cannot co-exist with a conventional voice service on the same pair as it takes over the entire bandwidth.

=== Standardization efforts ===
SDSL is a proprietary technology that was never standardized. As such it usually only interoperates with devices from the same vendor. It is the predecessor of G.SHDSL which was standardized in February 2001 by ITU-T with recommendation G.991.2. SDSL is often confused with G.SHDSL and HDSL; in Europe, G.SHDSL was standardized by ETSI using the name 'SDSL'. This ETSI variant is compatible with the ITU-T G.SHDSL standardized regional variant for Europe.

As there is a standardised successor available, SDSL installations today are considered legacy. Most new installations use G.SHDSL equipment instead of SDSL.

=== Target audience ===
SDSL typically falls between ADSL and T1/E1 in price and was mainly targeted at small and medium businesses which don't need the service guarantees of Frame Relay or the higher performance of a leased line.

== See also ==
- ISDN
- List of interface bit rates
