= Single-pair high-speed digital subscriber line =

SHDSL WAN Interface Card for a Cisco router

Single-pair high-speed digital subscriber line (SHDSL) is a form of symmetric digital subscriber line (SDSL), a data communications technology for equal transmit and receive (i.e. symmetric) data rate over copper telephone lines, faster than a conventional voiceband modem can provide. As opposed to other DSL technologies, SHDSL employs trellis-coded pulse-amplitude modulation (TC-PAM). As a baseband transmission scheme, TC-PAM operates at frequencies that include those used by the analog voice plain old telephone service (POTS). As such, a frequency splitter, or DSL filter, cannot be used to allow a telephone line to be shared by both an SHDSL service and a POTS service at the same time. Support of symmetric data rates made SHDSL a popular choice by businesses for private branch exchange (PBX), virtual private network (VPN), web hosting and other data services.

SHDSL features symmetrical data rates in both the upstream and downstream directions, from 192 kbit/s to 2,312 kbit/s of payload in 8 kbit/s increments for one pair and 384 kbit/s to 4,624 kbit/s in 16 kbit/s increments for two pairs of wires. The reach varies according to the loop rate and noise conditions (more noise or higher rate means decreased reach) and may be up to 3,000 meters. The two pair feature may alternatively be used for increased reach applications by keeping the data rate low. Halving the data rate per pair will provide similar speeds to single pair lines while increasing the error/noise tolerance.

With the 32-TC-PAM modulation scheme described in Annexes F and G, symmetric data rates of up to 5,696 kbit/s are permitted on one pair in the optional extended SHDSL mode. Up to four pairs of wires may be bonded using M-pair bonding to produce data rates as high as M5,696 kbit/s. By using four bonded wire pairs, a single SHDSL interface can transmit up to 22,784 kbit/s.

The SHDSL payload may be either 'clear channel' (unstructured), T1 or E1 (full rate or fractional), multiple ISDN Basic Rate Interface (BRI), Asynchronous Transfer Mode (ATM) cells or Ethernet packets. A 'dual bearer' mode allows a mixture of two separate streams (e.g. T1 and ATM) to share the SHDSL bandwidth.

== SHDSL standards ==
The industry standard for SHDSL is defined by ITU-T recommendation G.991.2. This was first published in February 2001. SHDSL equipment is also known by the standard's draft name of G.SHDSL. Major updates to G.991.2 were released in December 2003. Equipment conforming to the 2003 version of G.991.2 is often referred to by the standard's draft name of G.SHDSL.bis or just SHDSL.bis. The updated G.991.2 features:

- Optional support for up to four copper pair connections (M-pair)
- Optional extensions to allow user data rates up to 5696 kbit/s per pair, described in Annexes F and G
- Optional support for dynamic rate repartitioning, allowing flexible change of the SHDSL data rate without service interruption, described in Annex E.10.3
- New payload definitions including Ethernet packet transfer mode (PTM), described in Annex E.11

SHDSL supersedes the older HDSL symmetric DSL technology defined in ITU-T G.991.1. SHDSL has largely been replaced by VDSL2 because of greater bandwidth, less interference and greater utilization.

In Europe, a variant of SHDSL was standardized by the European Telecommunications Standards Institute (ETSI) using the name 'SDSL'. This ETSI variant is compatible with the ITU-T SHDSL standardized regional variant for Europe and must not be confused with the usage of the term SDSL in North America to refer to symmetric digital subscriber line.
