= Data rate =

Data rate and data transfer rate can refer to several related and overlapping concepts in communications networks:

== Achieved rate ==
- Bit rate, the number of bits that are conveyed or processed per unit of time
  - Data signaling rate or gross bit rate, a bit rate that includes protocol overhead
- Symbol rate or baud rate, the number of symbol changes, waveform changes, or signaling events across the transmission medium per unit of time
- Data-rate units, measures of the bit rate or baud rate of a link
- Data transfer rate (disk drive), a data rate specific to disk drive operations
- Throughput, the rate of successful message delivery, or level of bandwidth consumption
- Transfers per second

== Capacity ==
- Bandwidth (computing), the maximum rate of data transfer across a given path
- Channel capacity, an information-theoretic upper bound on the rate at which data can be reliably transmitted, given noise on a channel
