= List of interface bit rates =

This is a list of interface bit rates, a measure of information transfer rate, or digital bandwidth capacity, at which digital interfaces in a computer or network can communicate over various kinds of buses and channels. The distinction can be arbitrary between a computer bus, often closer in space, and larger telecommunications networks.

Many device interfaces or protocols (e.g., SATA, USB, SAS, PCIe) are used both inside many-device boxes, such as a PC, and one-device boxes, such as a hard drive enclosure. Accordingly, this page lists both the internal ribbon and external communications cable standards together in one sortable table.

== Factors limiting actual performance, criteria for real decisions ==
Most of the listed rates are theoretical maximum throughput measures; in practice, the actual effective throughput is almost inevitably lower in proportion to the load from other devices (network/bus contention), physical or temporal distances, and other overhead in data link layer protocols etc. The maximum goodput (for example, the file transfer rate) may be even lower due to higher layer protocol overhead and data packet retransmissions caused by line noise or interference such as crosstalk, or lost packets in congested intermediate network nodes. All protocols lose something, and the more robust ones that deal resiliently with very many failure situations tend to lose more maximum throughput to get higher total long-term rates.

Device interfaces where one bus transfers data via another will be limited to the throughput of the slowest interface, at best. For instance, SATA revision 3.0 (6 Gbit/s) controllers on one PCI Express 2.0 (5 Gbit/s) channel will be limited to the 5 Gbit/s rate and have to employ more channels to get around this problem. Early implementations of new protocols very often have this kind of problem. The physical phenomena on which the device relies (such as spinning platters in a hard drive) will also impose limits; for instance, no spinning platter shipping in 2009 saturates SATA revision 2.0 (3 Gbit/s), so moving from this 3 Gbit/s interface to USB 3.0 at 4.8 Gbit/s for one spinning drive will result in no increase in realized transfer rate.

Contention in a wireless or noisy spectrum, where the physical medium is entirely out of the control of those who specify the protocol, requires measures that also use up throughput. Wireless devices, BPL, and modems may produce a higher line rate or gross bit rate, due to error-correcting codes and other physical layer overhead. It is extremely common for throughput to be far less than half of theoretical maximum, though the more recent technologies (notably BPL) employ preemptive spectrum analysis to avoid this and so have much more potential to reach actual gigabit rates in practice than prior modems.

Another factor reducing throughput is deliberate policy decisions made by Internet service providers that are made for contractual, risk management, aggregation saturation, or marketing reasons. Examples are rate limiting, bandwidth throttling, and the assignment of IP addresses to groups. These practices tend to minimize the throughput available to every user, but maximize the number of users that can be supported on one backbone.

Furthermore, chips are often not available in order to implement the fastest rates. AMD, for instance, does not support the 32-bit HyperTransport interface on any CPU it has shipped as of the end of 2009. Additionally, WiMAX service providers in the US typically support only up to 4 Mbit/s as of the end of 2009.

Choosing service providers or interfaces based on theoretical maxima is unwise, especially for commercial needs. A good example is large scale data centers, which should be more concerned with price per port to support the interface, wattage and heat considerations, and total cost of the solution. Because some protocols such as SCSI and Ethernet now operate many orders of magnitude faster than when originally deployed, scalability of the interface is one major factor, as it prevents costly shifts to technologies that are not backward compatible. Underscoring this is the fact that these shifts often happen involuntarily or by surprise, especially when a vendor abandons support for a proprietary system.

== Conventions ==
By convention, bus and network data rates are denoted either in bits per second – bit/s, kbit/s (10^{3} bit/s), Mbit/s (10^{6} bit/s), Gbit/s (10^{9} bit/s), Tbit/s (10^{12} bit/s) – or bytes per second – B/s, kB/s (10^{3} B/s), MB/s (10^{6} B/s), GB/s (10^{9} B/s), TB/s (10^{12} B/s). In general, parallel interfaces are quoted in B/s and serial in bit/s. The more commonly used is shown below in bold type.

On devices like modems, bytes may be more than 8 bits long because they may be individually padded out with additional start and stop bits; the figures below will reflect this. Where channels use line codes (such as Ethernet, Serial ATA, and PCI Express), quoted rates are for the decoded signal.

The figures below are simplex data rates, which may conflict with the duplex rates vendors sometimes use in promotional materials. Where two values are listed, the first value is the downstream rate and the second value is the upstream rate.

The use of decimal prefixes is standard in data communications.

== Bandwidths ==
The figures below are grouped by network or bus type, then sorted within each group from lowest to highest bandwidth; gray shading indicates a lack of known implementations.

As stated above, all quoted bandwidths are for each direction. Therefore, for duplex interfaces (capable of simultaneous transmission both ways), the stated values are simplex (one way) speeds, rather than total upstream+downstream.

=== Historical ===
Technology	Maximum rate	Rate excluding overhead	Year
Smoke signals	millibits/s		Throughout history
Morse code (skilled operator)	21 bits/s (Note: Morse can transport 26 alphabetic, 10 numeric and one interword gap plaintext symbols. Transmitting 37 different symbols requires 5.21 bits of information (2^{5.21} = 37). A skilled operator encoding the benchmark "PARIS" plus an interword gap (equal to 31.26 bits) at 40 wpm is operating at an equivalence of 20.84 bit/s.)	4 characters per second (cps) (~40 wpm) (Note: WPM, or words per minute, is the number of times the word "PARIS" is transferred per minute. Strictly speaking the code is quinary, accounting inter-element, inter-letter, and inter-word gaps, yielding 50 binary elements (bits) per one word. Counting characters, including inter-word gaps, gives six characters per word or 240 characters per minute, and finally four characters per second.)	1844
Normal human speech	39 bits/s		Prehistoric

=== Radio clock ===
Time signal station to radio clock

Technology	Maximum rate		Year
IRIG and related	1 bit/s	~0.125 characters/s	1960

=== Teletypewriter (TTY) or telecommunications device for the deaf (TDD) ===
Technology	Maximum rate		Year
TTY (V.18)	45.4545 bit/s	6 characters/s	1994
TTY (V.18)	50 bit/s	6.6 characters/s	1994
NTSC Line 21 closed captioning	1 kbit/s	~100 characters/s	1976

=== Modems (narrowband and broadband) ===
==== Narrowband (POTS: 4 kHz channel) ====
Technology	Rate	Rate excluding overhead	Year
Teleprinter (50 baud)	0.05 kbit/s	404 operations per minute	1940x
Modem 110 baud (Bell 101)	0.11 kbit/s	0.010 kB/s (~10 cps) (Note: All modems are wrongly assumed to be in serial operation with 1 start bit, 8 data bits, no parity, and 1 stop bit (2 stop bits for 110-baud modems). Therefore, currently modems are wrongly calculated with transmission of 10 bits per 8-bit byte (11 bits for 110-baud modems). Although the serial port is nearly always used to connect a modem and has equivalent data rates, the protocols, modulations and error correction differ completely.)	1959
Modem 300 (300 baud; Bell 103 or V.21)	0.3 kbit/s	0.03 kB/s (~30 cps)	1962
Modem 1200/75 (600 baud; V.23)	1.2/0.075 kbit/s	0.12/0.0075 kB/s (~120 cps)	1964(?)
Modem 1200 (600 baud; Vadic VA3400, Bell 212A, or V.22)	1.2 kbit/s	0.12 kB/s (~120 cps)	1976
Modem 1200 (Bell 202C, 202D)	1.2 kbit/s	0.15 kB/s (~150 cps)	1976
Modem 2000 (Bell 201A)	2 kbit/s	0.25 kB/s (~250 cps)	1962
Modem 2400 (Bell 201B)	2.4 kbit/s	0.3 kB/s (~300 cps)	?
Modem 2400 (600 baud; V.22bis)	2.4 kbit/s	0.3 kB/s	1984
Modem 4800/75 (1600 baud; V.27ter)	4.8/0.075 kbit/s	0.6/0.0075 kB/s	1976
Modem 4800 (1600 baud, Bell 208A, 208B)	4.8 kbit/s	0.6 kB/s	?
Modem 9600 (2400 baud; V.32)	9.6 kbit/s	1.2 kB/s	1984
Modem 14.4 (2400 baud; V.32bis)	14.4 kbit/s	1.8 kB/s	1991
Modem 28.8 (3200 baud; V.34-1994)	28.8 kbit/s	3.6 kB/s	1994
Modem 33.6 (3429 baud; V.34-1996/98)	33.6 kbit/s	4.2 kB/s	1996
Modem 56k (8000/3429 baud; V.90)	56.0/33.6 kbit/s (Note: 56K modems: V.90 and V.92 have just 5% overhead for the protocol signalling. The maximum capacity can only be achieved when the upstream (service provider) end of the connection is digital, i.e. a DS0 channel.)	7/4.2 kB/s	1998
Modem 56k (8000/8000 baud; V.92)	56.0/48.0 kbit/s	7/6 kB/s	2001
Modem data compression (variable; V.92/V.44)	56.0–320.0 kbit/s	7–40 kB/s	2000
ISP-side text/image compression (variable)	56.0–1000.0 kbit/s	7–125 kB/s	1998
ISDN Basic Rate Interface (single/dual channel)	64/128 kbit/s (Note: Effective aggregate bandwidth for an ISDN installation is typically higher than the rates shown for a single channel due to the use of multiple channels. A basic rate interface (BRI) provides two "B" channels and one "D" channel. Each B channel provides 64 kbit/s bandwidth and the "D" channel carries signaling (call setup) information. B channels can be bonded to provide a 128 kbit/s data rate. Primary rate interfaces (PRI) vary depending on whether the region uses E1 (Europe, world) or T1 (North America) bearers. In E1 regions, the PRI carries 30 B-channels and one D-channel; in T1 regions the PRI carries 23 B-channels and one D-channel. The D-channel has different bandwidth on the two interfaces.)	8/16 kB/s	1986
IDSL (dual ISDN + 16 kbit/s data channels)	144 kbit/s	18 kB/s	2000

==== Broadband (hundreds of kHz to GHz wide) ====
Technology	Rate	Rate excluding overhead	Year
ADSL (G.lite)	1536/512 kbit/s	192/64 kB/s	1998
HDSL ITU G.991.1 a.k.a. DS1	1544 kbit/s	193 kB/s	1998
MSDSL	2000 kbit/s	250 kB/s	?
SDSL	2320 kbit/s	290 kB/s	?
SHDSL ITU G.991.2	5690 kbit/s	711 kB/s	2001
ADSL (G.dmt) ITU G.992.1	8192/1024 kbit/s	1024/128 kB/s	1999
ADSL2 ITU G.992.3/4	12288/1440 kbit/s	1536/180 kB/s	2002
ADSL2+ ITU G.992.5	24576/3584 kbit/s	3072/448 kB/s	2003
DOCSIS 1.0 (cable modem)	38/9 Mbit/s	4.75/1.125 MB/s	1997
DOCSIS 2.0 (cable modem)	38/27 Mbit/s	4.75/3.375 MB/s	2002
VDSL ITU G.993.1	52 Mbit/s	7 MB/s	2001
VDSL2 ITU G.993.2	100 Mbit/s	12.5 MB/s	2006
Uni-DSL	200 Mbit/s	25 MB/s	2006
VDSL2 ITU G.993.2 Amendment 1 (11/15)	300 Mbit/s	37.5 MB/s	2015
BPON (G.983) (fiber optic service)	622/155 Mbit/s	77.7/19.3 MB/s	2005
EPON (802.3ah) (fiber optic service)	1000/1000 Mbit/s	125/125 MB/s	2008
DOCSIS 3.0 (cable modem)	1216/216 Mbit/s	152/27 MB/s	2006
G.fast ITU G.9701	2000 Mbit/s	250 MB/s	2019
GPON (G.984) (fiber optic service)	2488/1244 Mbit/s	311/155.5 MB/s	2008
DOCSIS 3.1 (cable modem)	10/2 Gbit/s	1.25/0.25 GB/s	2013
10G-PON (G.987) (fiber optic service)	10/2.5 Gbit/s	1.25/0.3125 GB/s	2012
DOCSIS 4.0 (cable modem)	10/6 Gbit/s	1.25/0.75 GB/s	2017
XGS-PON (G.9807.1) (fiber optic service)	10/10 Gbit/s	1.25/1.25 GB/s	2016
NG-PON2 (G.989) (fiber optic service)	40/10 Gbit/s	5/1.25 GB/s	2015
HSP (G.9804) (fiber optic service)	50/50 Gbit/s	6.25/6.25 GB/s	2019

=== Mobile telephone interfaces ===
Technology	Download rate		Upload rate		Year
GSM CSD (2G)	14.4 kbit/s (Note: Most operators only support up to 9600 bit/s)	1.8 kB/s	14.4 kbit/s	1.8 kB/s	
HSCSD	57.6 kbit/s	7.2 kB/s	14.4 kbit/s	1.8 kB/s	
GPRS (2.5G)	57.6 kbit/s	7.2 kB/s	28.8 kbit/s	3.6 kB/s	
WiDEN	100 kbit/s	12.5 kB/s	100 kbit/s	12.5 kB/s	
CDMA2000 1×RTT	153 kbit/s	18 kB/s	153 kbit/s	18 kB/s	
EDGE (2.75G) (type 1 MS)	236.8 kbit/s	29.6 kB/s	236.8 kbit/s	29.6 kB/s	2002
UMTS 3G	384 kbit/s	48 kB/s	384 kbit/s	48 kB/s	
EDGE (type 2 MS)	473.6 kbit/s	59.2 kB/s	473.6 kbit/s	59.2 kB/s	
EDGE Evolution (type 1 MS)	1184 kbit/s	148 kB/s	474 kbit/s	59 kB/s	
EDGE Evolution (type 2 MS)	1894 kbit/s	237 kB/s	947 kbit/s	118 kB/s	
1×EV-DO rev. 0	2457 kbit/s	307.2 kB/s	153 kbit/s	19 kB/s	
1×EV-DO rev. A	3.1 Mbit/s	397 kB/s	1.8 Mbit/s	230 kB/s	
LTE Cat 1	10 Mbit/s	1250 kB/s	5.2 Mbit/s	650 kB/s	
1×EV-DO rev. B	14.7 Mbit/s	1837 kB/s	5.4 Mbit/s	675 kB/s	
HSPA (3.5G)	13.98 Mbit/s	1706 kB/s	5.760 Mbit/s	720 kB/s	
4×EV-DO Enhancements (2×2 MIMO)	34.4 Mbit/s	4.3 MB/s	12.4 Mbit/s	1.55 MB/s	
HSPA+ (2×2 MIMO)	42 Mbit/s	5.25 MB/s	11.5 Mbit/s	1.437 MB/s	
LTE Cat 2	50 Mbit/s	6.25 MB/s	25 Mbit/s	3.375 MB/s	
15×EV-DO rev. B	73.5 Mbit/s	9.2 MB/s	27 Mbit/s	3.375 MB/s	
LTE Cat 3	100 Mbit/s	12.5 MB/s	50 Mbit/s	6.25 MB/s	
UMB (2×2 MIMO)	140 Mbit/s	17.5 MB/s	34 Mbit/s	4.250 MB/s	
LTE Cat 4	150 Mbit/s	18.75 MB/s	50 Mbit/s	6.25 MB/s	
LTE (2×2 MIMO)	173 Mbit/s	21.625 MB/s	58 Mbit/s	7.25 MB/s	2004
UMB (4×4 MIMO)	280 Mbit/s	35 MB/s	68 Mbit/s	8.5 MB/s	
EV-DO rev. C	280 Mbit/s	35 MB/s	75 Mbit/s	9 MB/s	
LTE Cat 5	300 Mbit/s	37.5 MB/s	50 Mbit/s	6.25 MB/s	
LTE Cat 6	300 Mbit/s	37.5 MB/s	75 Mbit/s	9.375 MB/s	
LTE Cat 7	300 Mbit/s	37.5 MB/s	100 Mbit/s	12.5 MB/s	
LTE (4×4 MIMO)	326 Mbit/s	40.750 MB/s	86 Mbit/s	10.750 MB/s	
LTE Cat 13	390 Mbit/s	48.75 MB/s	150 Mbit/s	18.75 MB/s	
LTE Cat 9	450 Mbit/s	56.25 MB/s	50 Mbit/s	6.25 MB/s	
LTE Cat 10	450 Mbit/s	56.25 MB/s	100 Mbit/s	12.5 MB/s	
LTE Cat 11	600 Mbit/s	75 MB/s	50 Mbit/s	6.25 MB/s	
LTE Cat 12	600 Mbit/s	75 MB/s	100 Mbit/s	12.5 MB/s	
LTE Cat 16	1000 Mbit/s	125 MB/s	50 Mbit/s	6.25 MB/s	
LTE Cat 18	1200 Mbit/s	150 MB/s	150 Mbit/s	18.75 MB/s	
LTE Cat 21	1400 Mbit/s	175 MB/s	300 Mbit/s	37.5 MB/s	
LTE Cat 20	2000 Mbit/s	250 MB/s	300 Mbit/s	37.5 MB/s	
LTE Cat 8	3 Gbit/s	375 MB/s	1.5 Gbit/s	187 MB/s	
LTE Cat 14	3.9 Gbit/s	487 MB/s	1.5 Gbit/s	187 MB/s	
5G NR	10 Gbit/s	1.25 GB/s	10 Gbit/s	1.25 GB/s	?

=== Wide area networks ===
Technology	Rate		Year
56k line	56 kbit/s	7 KB/s	1990
DS0	64 kbit/s	8 KB/s	
G.lite (a.k.a. ADSL Lite)	1.536/0.512 Mbit/s	0.192/0.064 MB/s	
DS1 / T1 (and ISDN Primary Rate Interface)	1.544 Mbit/s	0.192 MB/s	1990
E1 (and ISDN Primary Rate Interface)	2.048 Mbit/s	0.256 MB/s	
G.SHDSL	2.304 Mbit/s	0.288 MB/s	
SDSL (Note: SDSL is available in various speeds.)	2.32 Mbit/s	0.29 MB/s	
LR-VDSL2 (4 to 5 km [long-]range) (symmetry optional)	4 Mbit/s	0.512 MB/s	
T2	6.312 Mbit/s	0.789 MB/s	
ADSL (Note: ADSL connections will vary in throughput from 64 kbit/s to several Mbit/s depending on configuration. Most are commonly below 2 Mbit/s. Some ADSL and SDSL connections have a higher digital bandwidth than T1 but their rate is not guaranteed, and will drop when the system gets overloaded, whereas the T1 type connections are usually guaranteed and have no contention ratios.)	8.0/1.024 Mbit/s	1.0/0.128 MB/s	
E2	8.448 Mbit/s	1.056 MB/s	
ADSL2	12/3.5 Mbit/s	1.5/0.448 MB/s	
Satellite Internet (Note: Satellite internet may have a high bandwidth but also has a high latency due to the distance between the modem, satellite and hub. One-way satellite connections exist where all the downstream traffic is handled by satellite and the upstream traffic by land-based connections such as 56K modems and ISDN.)	16/1 Mbit/s	2.0/0.128 MB/s	
ADSL2+	24/3.5 Mbit/s	3.0/0.448 MB/s	
E3	34.368 Mbit/s	4.296 MB/s	
DOCSIS 1.0 (cable modem)	38/9 Mbit/s	4.75/1.125 MB/s	1997
DOCSIS 2.0 (cable modem)	38/27 Mbit/s	4.75/3.38 MB/s	2002
DS3 / T3 ('45 Meg')	44.736 Mbit/s	5.5925 MB/s	
STS-1 / OC-1 / STM-0	51.84 Mbit/s	6.48 MB/s	
VDSL (symmetry optional)	100 Mbit/s	12.5 MB/s	
OC-3 / STM-1	155.52 Mbit/s	19.44 MB/s	
VDSL2 (symmetry optional)	250 Mbit/s	31.25 MB/s	
T4	274.176 Mbit/s	34.272 MB/s	
T5	400.352 Mbit/s	50.044 MB/s	
OC-9	466.56 Mbit/s	58.32 MB/s	
OC-12 / STM-4	622.08 Mbit/s	77.76 MB/s	
OC-18	933.12 Mbit/s	116.64 MB/s	
DOCSIS 3.0 (cable modem)	1216/216 Mbit/s	152/27 MB/s	2006
OC-24	1.244 Gbit/s	155.5 MB/s	
OC-36	1.900 Gbit/s	237.5 MB/s	
OC-48 / STM-16	2.488 Gbit/s	311.04 MB/s	
OC-96	4.976 Gbit/s	622.08 MB/s	
OC-192 / STM-64	9.953 Gbit/s	1.244125 GB/s	
10 Gigabit Ethernet WAN PHY	9.953 Gbit/s	1.244125 GB/s	
DOCSIS 3.1 (cable modem)	10/2 Gbit/s	1.25/0.25 GB/s	2013
DOCSIS 4.0 (cable modem)	10/6 Gbit/s	1.25/0.75 GB/s	2017
OC-256	13.271 Gbit/s	1.659 GB/s	
OC-768 / STM-256	39.813 Gbit/s	4.976 GB/s	
OC-1536 / STM-512	79.626 Gbit/s	9.953 GB/s	
OC-3072 / STM-1024	159.252 Gbit/s	19.907 GB/s	

=== Local area networks ===
Technology	Rate		Year
LocalTalk	230 kbit/s	28.8 kB/s	1985
Econet	800 kbit/s	100 kB/s	1981
Omninet	1 Mbit/s	125 kB/s	1980
IBM PC Network	2 Mbit/s	250 kB/s	1985
ARCNET (Standard)	2.5 Mbit/s	312.5 kB/s	1977
Chaosnet (Original)	4 Mbit/s	3.0 Mbit/s	1971
Token Ring (Original)	4 Mbit/s	500 kB/s	1985
Ethernet (10BASE-X)	10 Mbit/s	1.25 MB/s	1980 (1985 IEEE Standard)
Token Ring (Later)	16 Mbit/s	2 MB/s	1989
ARCnet Plus	20 Mbit/s	2.5 MB/s	1992
TCNS	100 Mbit/s	12.5 MB/s	1993?
100VG	100 Mbit/s	12.5 MB/s	1995
Token Ring IEEE 802.5t	100 Mbit/s	12.5 MB/s	
Fast Ethernet (100BASE-X)	100 Mbit/s	12.5 MB/s	1995
FDDI	100 Mbit/s	12.5 MB/s	
MoCA 1.0	100 Mbit/s	12.5 MB/s	
MoCA 1.1	175 Mbit/s	21.875 MB/s	
HomePlug AV	200 Mbit/s	25 MB/s	2005
FireWire (IEEE 1394) 400 (Note: FireWire natively supports TCP/IP, and is often used at an alternative to Ethernet when connecting 2 nodes.) (Note: Data rate comparison between FW and Giganet shows that FW's lower overhead has nearly the same throughput as Giganet.)	400 Mbit/s	50 MB/s	1995
MoCa 2.0	500 Mbit/s	62.5 MB/s	2016
HIPPI	800 Mbit/s	100 MB/s	
IEEE 1901	1000 Mbit/s	125 MB/s	2010
Token Ring IEEE 802.5v	1 Gbit/s	125 MB/s	2001
Gigabit Ethernet (1000BASE-X)	1 Gbit/s	125 MB/s	1998
Stanford DASH/NUMAlink 1	1.920 Gbit/s	240 MB/s	~1990
Myrinet 2000	2 Gbit/s	250 MB/s	
InfiniBand SDR 1×	2 Gbit/s	250 MB/s	2001, 2003
Reflective memory or RFM2 (1.25 μs latency)	2 Gbit/s	250 MB/s	2017
RapidIO Gen1 1×	2.5 Gbit/s	312.5 MB/s	2000
2.5 Gigabit Ethernet (2.5GBASE-T)	2.5 Gbit/s	312.5 MB/s	2016
Quadrics QsNet^{I}	3.6 Gbit/s	450 MB/s	
InfiniBand DDR 1×	4 Gbit/s	500 MB/s	2005
RapidIO Gen2 1×	5 Gbit/s	625 MB/s	2008
5 Gigabit Ethernet (5GBASE-T)	5 Gbit/s	625 MB/s	2016
InfiniBand QDR 1×	8 Gbit/s	1 GB/s	2007
InfiniBand SDR 4×	8 Gbit/s	1 GB/s	2001, 2003
Quadrics QsNet^{II}	8 Gbit/s	1 GB/s	
RapidIO Gen1 4x	10 Gbit/s	1.25 GB/s	
RapidIO Gen2 2x	10 Gbit/s	1.25 GB/s	2008
10 Gigabit Ethernet (10GBASE-X)	10 Gbit/s	1.25 GB/s	2002-2006
Myri 10G	10 Gbit/s	1.25 GB/s	
InfiniBand FDR-10 1×	10 Gbit/s	1.25 GB/s	2011
NUMAlink 2	12.8 Gbit/s	1.6 GB/s	1996
InfiniBand FDR 1×	13.64 Gbit/s	1.7 GB/s	2011
InfiniBand SDR 8×	16 Gbit/s	2 GB/s	2001, 2003
InfiniBand DDR 4×	16 Gbit/s	2 GB/s	2005
RapidIO Gen2 4x	20 Gbit/s	2.5 GB/s	2008
Scalable Coherent Interface (SCI) Dual Channel SCI, x8 PCIe	20 Gbit/s	2.5 GB/s	
InfiniBand SDR 12×	24 Gbit/s	3 GB/s	
RapidIO Gen4 1×	24.63 Gbit/s	3.079 GB/s	2016
InfiniBand EDR 1×	25 Gbit/s	3.125 GB/s	2014
25 Gigabit Ethernet (25GBASE-X)	25 Gbit/s	3.125 GB/s	2016
NUMAlink 3	25.6 Gbit/s	3.2 GB/s	2000
InfiniBand DDR 8×	32 Gbit/s	6 GB/s	2005
InfiniBand QDR 4×	32 Gbit/s	4 GB/s	2007
RapidIO Gen2 8x	40 Gbit/s	5 GB/s	2008
40 Gigabit Ethernet (40GBASE-X) 4×	40 Gbit/s	5 GB/s	2010
InfiniBand FDR-10 4×	40 Gbit/s	5 GB/s	2011
InfiniBand DDR 12×	48 Gbit/s	6 GB/s	2005
50 Gigabit Ethernet (50GBASE-X)	50 Gbit/s	6.25 GB/s	2016
InfiniBand HDR 1×	50 Gbit/s	6.25 GB/s	2017
NUMAlink 4	51.2 Gbit/s	6.4 GB/s	2004
NUMAlink 6	53.6 Gbit/s	6.7 GB/s	2012
InfiniBand FDR 4×	54.56 Gbit/s	6.82 GB/s	2011
InfiniBand QDR 8×	64 Gbit/s	4 GB/s	2007
RapidIO Gen2 16×	80 Gbit/s	10 GB/s	2008
InfiniBand FDR-10 8×	80 Gbit/s	5 GB/s	2011
InfiniBand QDR 12×	96 Gbit/s	12 GB/s	2007
InfiniBand EDR 4×	100 Gbit/s	12.5 GB/s	2014
100 Gigabit Ethernet (100GBASE-X) 10×/4×	100 Gbit/s	12.5 GB/s	2010/2018
Omni-Path	100 Gbit/s	12.5 GB/s	2015
InfiniBand NDR 1×	100 Gbit/s	12.5 GB/s	2022
NUMAlink 8 (Flex ASIC)	106.4 Gbit/s	13.3 GB/s	2017
InfiniBand FDR 8×	109.12 Gbit/s	13.64 GB/s	2011
NUMAlink 7	119.52 Gbit/s	14.94 GB/s	2014
NUMAlink 5	120 Gbit/s	15 GB/s	2009
InfiniBand FDR-10 12×	120 Gbit/s	15 GB/s	2011
InfiniBand FDR 12×	163.68 Gbit/s	20.45 GB/s	2011
InfiniBand EDR 8×	200 Gbit/s	25 GB/s	2014
InfiniBand HDR 4×	200 Gbit/s	25 GB/s	2017
200 Gigabit Ethernet (200GBASE-X)	200 Gbit/s	25 GB/s	2017
InfiniBand XDR 1×	200 Gbit/s	25 GB/s	2024
InfiniBand EDR 12×	300 Gbit/s	37.5 GB/s	2014
400 Gigabit Ethernet (400GBASE-X)	400 Gbit/s	50 GB/s	2017
InfiniBand HDR 8×	400 Gbit/s	50 GB/s	2017
InfiniBand NDR 4×	400 Gbit/s	50 GB/s	2022
InfiniBand GDR 1×	400 Gbit/s	50 GB/s	TBA
InfiniBand HDR 12×	600 Gbit/s	75 GB/s	2017
InfiniBand NDR 8×	800 Gbit/s	100 GB/s	2022
InfiniBand XDR 4×	800 Gbit/s	100 GB/s	2024
800 Gigabit Ethernet (800GBASE-X)	800 Gbit/s	100 GB/s	2024
InfiniBand NDR 12×	1200 Gbit/s	150 GB/s	2022
InfiniBand XDR 8×	1600 Gbit/s	200 GB/s	2024
InfiniBand GDR 4×	1600 Gbit/s	200 GB/s	TBA
InfiniBand XDR 12×	2400 Gbit/s	300 GB/s	2024
InfiniBand GDR 8×	3200 Gbit/s	400 GB/s	TBA
InfiniBand GDR 12×	4800 Gbit/s	600 GB/s	TBA

=== Wireless networks ===
802.11 networks in infrastructure mode are half-duplex; all stations share the medium. In infrastructure or access point mode, all traffic has to pass through an access point (AP). Thus, two stations on the same access point that are communicating with each other must have each and every frame transmitted twice: from the sender to the access point, then from the access point to the receiver. This approximately halves the effective bandwidth.

802.11 networks in ad hoc mode are still half-duplex, but devices communicate directly rather than through an access point. In this mode all devices must be able to see each other, instead of only having to be able to see the access point.

Standard	Maximum link rate		Year
Classic WaveLAN	2 Mbit/s	250 kB/s	1988
IEEE 802.11	2 Mbit/s	250 kB/s	1997
RONJA (full duplex)	10 Mbit/s	1.25 MB/s	2001
IEEE 802.11a	54 Mbit/s	6.75 MB/s	1999
IEEE 802.11b	11 Mbit/s	1.375 MB/s	1999
IEEE 802.11g	54 Mbit/s	6.75 MB/s	2003
IEEE 802.16 (WiMAX)	70 Mbit/s	8.75 MB/s	2004
IEEE 802.11g with Super G by Atheros	108 Mbit/s	13.5 MB/s	2003
IEEE 802.11g with 125 High; Speed Mode by Broadcom	125 Mbit/s	15.625 MB/s	2003
IEEE 802.11g with Nitro by Conexant	140 Mbit/s	17.5 MB/s	2003
IEEE 802.11n (aka Wi-Fi 4)	600 Mbit/s	75 MB/s	2009
IEEE 802.11ac (aka Wi-Fi 5)	6.8–6.93 Gbit/s	850–866.25 MB/s	2012
IEEE 802.11ad	7.14–7.2 Gbit/s	892.5–900 MB/s	2011
IEEE 802.11ax (aka Wi-Fi 6/6E)	11 Gbit/s	1.375 GB/s	2019
IEEE 802.11be (aka Wi-Fi 7 or Extremely High Throughput (EHT))	46.12 Gbit/s expected	5.765 GB/s expected	2025
IEEE 802.11bn (aka Wi-Fi 8 or Ultra High Reliability (UHR))	100 Gbit/s expected	12.5 GB/s expected	2028 expected
IEEE 802.11ay (aka Enhanced; Throughput for Operation in License -exempt Bands above 45 GHz)	176 Gbit/s expected	22 GB/s expected	March 2021 standardized

=== Wireless personal area networks ===
Technology	Rate		Year
ANT	20 kbit/s	2.5 kB/s	
IrDA-Control	72 kbit/s	9 kB/s	
IrDA-SIR	115.2 kbit/s	14 kB/s	
802.15.4 (2.4 GHz)	250 kbit/s	31.25 kB/s	
Bluetooth 1.1	1 Mbit/s	125 kB/s	2002
Bluetooth 2.0+EDR	3 Mbit/s	375 kB/s	2004
IrDA-FIR	4 Mbit/s	500 kB/s	
IrDA-VFIR	16 Mbit/s	2 MB/s	
Bluetooth 3.0	25 Mbit/s	3.125 MB/s	2009
Bluetooth 4.0	25 Mbit/s	3.125 MB/s	2010
Bluetooth 5.0	50 Mbit/s	6.25 MB/s	2016
IrDA-UFIR	96 Mbit/s	12 MB/s	
WUSB-UWB	480 Mbit/s	60 MB/s	
IrDA-Giga-IR	1024 Mbit/s	128 MB/s	

=== Computer buses ===
==== Main buses ====
Technology	Rate		Year
I²C	3.4 Mbit/s	425 kB/s	1992 (standardized)
Apple II (incl. Apple IIGS) 8-bit/1 MHz	8 Mbit/s	1 MB/s	1977
SS-50 Bus 8-bit/1 MHz	8 Mbit/s	1 MB/s	1975
Unibus 16-bit/async	12 Mbit/s	1.5 MB/s	1969
STD-80 8-bit/8 MHz	16 Mbit/s	2 MB/s	
Q-bus 16-bit/async	24 Mbit/s	3 MB/s	1975
ISA 8-Bit/4.77 MHz	0 W/S: every 4 clocks 8 bits 1 W/S: every 5 clocks 8 bits	0 W/S: every 4 clocks 1 byte 1 W/S: every 5 clocks 1 byte	1981 (created)
STD-80 16-bit/8 MHz	32 Mbit/s	4 MB/s	
I3C (HDR mode)	33.3 Mbit/s	4.16 MB/s	2017
Zorro II 16-bit/7.14 MHz	42.4 Mbit/s	5.3 MB/s	1986
ISA 16-Bit/8.33 MHz	66.64 Mbit/s	8.33 MB/s	1984 (created)
Europe Card Bus 8-Bit/10 MHz	66.7 Mbit/s	8.33 MB/s	1977 (created)
S-100 bus 8-bit/10 MHz	80 Mbit/s	10 MB/s	1976 (published)
Serial Peripheral Interface (Up to 100 MHz)	100 Mbit/s	12.5 MB/s	1989
Low Pin Count	125 Mbit/s	15.63 MB/s ^{[x]}	2002
STEbus 8-Bit/16 MHz	128 Mbit/s	16 MB/s	1987 (standardized)
C-Bus 16-bit/10 MHz	160 Mbit/s	20 MB/s	1982
HP Precision Bus	184 Mbit/s	23 MB/s	
STD-32 32-bit/8 MHz	256 Mbit/s	32 MB/s	
NESA 32-bit/8 MHz	256 Mbit/s	32 MB/s	
EISA 32-bit/8.33 MHz	266.56 Mbit/s	33.32 MB/s	1988
VME64 32-64bit	400 Mbit/s	40 MB/s	1981
MCA 32-bit/10 MHz	400 Mbit/s	40 MB/s	1987
NuBus 10 MHz	400 Mbit/s	40 MB/s	1987 (standardized)
DEC TURBOchannel 32-bit/12.5 MHz	400 Mbit/s	50 MB/s	
NuBus90 20 MHz	800 Mbit/s	80 MB/s	1991
MCA 32-bit/20 MHz	800 Mbit/s	80 MB/s	1992
APbus 32-bit/25(?) MHz	800 Mbit/s	100 MB/s	
Sbus 32-bit/25 MHz	800 Mbit/s	100 MB/s	1989
DEC TURBOchannel 32-bit/25 MHz	800 Mbit/s	100 MB/s	
Local Bus 98 32-bit/33 MHz	1056 Mbit/s	132 MB/s	
VESA Local Bus (VLB) 32-bit/33 MHz	1067 Mbit/s	133.33 MB/s	1992
PCI 32-bit/33 MHz	1067 Mbit/s	133.33 MB/s	1993
HP GSC-1X	1136 Mbit/s	142 MB/s	
Zorro III 32-bit/async (eq. 37.5 MHz)	1200 Mbit/s	150 MB/s	1990
VESA Local Bus (VLB) 32-bit/40 MHz	1280 Mbit/s	160 MB/s	1992
Sbus 64-bit/25 MHz	1.6 Gbit/s	200 MB/s	1995
HP GSC-2X	2.048 Gbit/s	256 MB/s	
PCI 64-bit/33 MHz	2.133 Gbit/s	266.7 MB/s	1993
PCI 32-bit/66 MHz	2.133 Gbit/s	266.7 MB/s	1995
AGP 1×	2.133 Gbit/s	266.7 MB/s	1997
PCI Express 1.0 (×1 link) (Note: Note that PCI Express 1.0/2.0 lanes use an 8b/10b encoding scheme.)	2.5 Gbit/s	250 MB/s ^{[z]}	2004
RapidIO Gen1 1×	2.5 Gbit/s	312.5 MB/s	
HIO bus	2.560 Gbit/s	320 MB/s	
GIO64 64-bit/40 MHz	2.560 Gbit/s	320 MB/s	
PCI Express 2.0 (×1 link) (Note: PCIe 2.0 effectively doubles the bus standard's bandwidth from 2.5 GT/s to 5 GT/s)	5 Gbit/s	500 MB/s ^{[z]}	2007
AGP 2×	4.266 Gbit/s	533.3 MB/s	1997
PCI 64-bit/66 MHz	4.266 Gbit/s	533.3 MB/s	
PCI-X DDR 16-bit	4.266 Gbit/s	533.3 MB/s	
RapidIO Gen2 1×	5 Gbit/s	625 MB/s	
PCI 64-bit/100 MHz	6.4 Gbit/s	800 MB/s	
PCI Express 3.0 (×1 link) (Note: PCIe 3.0 increases the bandwidth from 5 GT/s to 8 GT/s and switches to 128b-130b encoding)	8 Gbit/s	984.6 MB/s ^{[y]}	2011
Unified Media Interface (UMI) (×4 link)	10 Gbit/s	1 GB/s ^{[z]}	2011
Direct Media Interface (DMI) (×4 link)	10 Gbit/s	1 GB/s ^{[z]}	2004
Enterprise Southbridge Interface (ESI)	8 Gbit/s	1 GB/s	
PCI Express 1.0 (×4 link)	10 Gbit/s	1 GB/s ^{[z]}	2004
AGP 4×	8.533 Gbit/s	1.067 GB/s	1998
PCI-X 133	8.533 Gbit/s	1.067 GB/s	
PCI-X QDR 16-bit	8.533 Gbit/s	1.067 GB/s	
InfiniBand single 4×	8 Gbit/s	1 GB/s ^{[z]}	
RapidIO Gen1 4×	10 Gbit/s	1.25 GB/s	
RapidIO Gen2 2×	10 Gbit/s	1.25 GB/s	
UPA	15.360 Gbit/s	1.92 GB/s	
Unified Media Interface 2.0 (UMI 2.0; ×4 link)	20 Gbit/s	2 GB/s ^{[z]}	2012
Direct Media Interface 2.0 (DMI 2.0; ×4 link)	20 Gbit/s	2 GB/s ^{[z]}	2011
PCI Express 1.0 (×8 link)	20 Gbit/s	2 GB/s ^{[z]}	2004
PCI Express 2.0 (×4 link)	20 Gbit/s	2 GB/s ^{[z]}	2007
AGP 8×	17.066 Gbit/s	2.133 GB/s	2002
PCI-X DDR	17.066 Gbit/s	2.133 GB/s	
RapidIO Gen2 4×	20 Gbit/s	2.5 GB/s	
Sun JBus (200 MHz)	20.48 Gbit/s	2.56 GB/s	2003
HyperTransport (800 MHz, 16-pair)	25.6 Gbit/s	3.2 GB/s	2001
PCI Express 3.0 (×4 link)	32 Gbit/s	3.94 GB/s ^{[y]}	2011
HyperTransport (1 GHz, 16-pair)	32 Gbit/s	4 GB/s	
PCI Express 1.0 (×16 link)	40 Gbit/s	4 GB/s ^{[z]}	2004
PCI Express 2.0 (×8 link)	40 Gbit/s	4 GB/s ^{[z]}	2007
PCI-X QDR	34.133 Gbit/s	4.266 GB/s	
AGP 8× 64-bit	34.133 Gbit/s	4.266 GB/s	
RapidIO Gen2 8x	40 Gbit/s	5 GB/s	
Direct Media Interface 3.0 (DMI 3.0; ×4 link)	31.5 Gbit/s	3.94 GB/s ^{[y]}	2015
CXL Specification 3.0 & 3.1 (×1 link)	60.504 Gbit/s	7.563 GB/s	2022, 2023
PCI Express 3.0 (×8 link)	64 Gbit/s	7.88 GB/s ^{[y]}	2011
PCI Express 2.0 (×16 link)	80 Gbit/s	8 GB/s ^{[z]}	2007
RapidIO Gen2 16x	80 Gbit/s	10 GB/s	
PCI Express 5.0 (×4 link)	128 Gbit/s	15.75 GB/s^{[y]}	2019
PCI Express 3.0 (×16 link)	128 Gbit/s	15.75 GB/s ^{[y]}	2011
CAPI	128 Gbit/s	15.75 GB/s ^{[y]}	2014
QPI (4.80GT/s, 2.40 GHz)	153.6 Gbit/s	19.2 GB/s	
HyperTransport 2.0 (1.4 GHz, 32-pair)	179.2 Gbit/s	22.4 GB/s	2004
QPI (5.86GT/s, 2.93 GHz)	187.52 Gbit/s	23.44 GB/s	
QPI (6.40GT/s, 3.20 GHz)	204.8 Gbit/s	25.6 GB/s	
QPI (7.2GT/s, 3.6 GHz)	230.4 Gbit/s	28.8 GB/s	2012
PCI Express 6.0 (×4 link)	242 Gbit/s	30.25 GB/s^{[w]}	2022
PCI Express 4.0 (×16 link)	256 Gbit/s	31.51 GB/s^{[y]}	2018
CAPI 2	256 Gbit/s	31.51 GB/s^{[y]}	2016
QPI (8.0GT/s, 4.0 GHz)	256.0 Gbit/s	32.0 GB/s	2012
QPI (9.6GT/s, 4.8 GHz)	307.2 Gbit/s	38.4 GB/s	2014
HyperTransport 3.0 (2.6 GHz, 32-pair)	332.8 Gbit/s	41.6 GB/s	2006
HyperTransport 3.1 (3.2 GHz, 32-pair)	409.6 Gbit/s	51.2 GB/s	2008
CXL Specification 1.x & 2.0 (×16 link)	512 Gbit/s	63.02 GB/s	2019, 2020
PCI Express 5.0 (×16 link)	512 Gbit/s	63.02 GB/s^{[y]}	2019
PCI Express 6.0 (×16 link)	968 Gbit/s	121 GB/s^{[w]}	2022
CXL Specification 3.0 & 3.1 (×16 link)	968 Gbit/s	121 GB/s	2022, 2023
NVLink 1.0 (4 links)	1280 Gbit/s	160 GB/s	2016
PCI Express 7.0 (×16 link)	1.936 Tbit/s	242 GB/s^{[w]}	2025
NVLink 2.0 (6 links)	2.4 Tbit/s	300 GB/s	2017
Infinity Fabric (Max. theoretical)	4.096 Tbit/s	512 GB/s	2017
NVLink 3.0 (12 links)	4.8 Tbit/s	600 GB/s	2020
NVLink 4.0 (18 links)	7.2 Tbit/s	900 GB/s	2022
NVLink 5.0 (18 links)	14.4 Tbit/s	1800 GB/s	2024

^{x} LPC protocol includes high overhead. While the gross data rate equals 33.3 million 4-bit-transfers per second (or 16.67 MB/s), the fastest transfer, firmware read, results in 15.63 MB/s. The next fastest bus cycle, 32-bit ISA-style DMA write, yields only 6.67 MB/s. Other transfers may be as low as 2 MB/s.

^{y} Uses 128b/130b encoding, meaning that about 1.54% of each transfer is used for error detection instead of carrying data between the hardware components at each end of the interface. For example, a single link PCIe 3.0 interface has an 8 Gbit/s transfer rate, yet its usable bandwidth is only about 7.88 Gbit/s.

^{z} Uses 8b/10b encoding, meaning that 20% of each transfer is used by the interface instead of carrying data from between the hardware components at each end of the interface. For example, a single link PCIe 1.0 has a 2.5 Gbit/s transfer rate, yet its usable bandwidth is only 2 Gbit/s (250 MB/s).

^{w} Uses PAM-4 encoding and a 256 bytes FLIT block, of which 14 bytes are FEC and CRC, meaning that 5.47% of total data rate is used for error detection and correction instead of carrying data. For example, a single link PCIe 6.0 interface has a 64 Gbit/s total transfer rate, yet its usable bandwidth is only 60.5 Gbit/s.

==== Portable ====
Technology	Rate		Year
PC Card 16-bit 255 ns byte mode	31.36 Mbit/s	3.92 MB/s	1990
PC Card 16-bit 255 ns word mode	62.72 Mbit/s	7.84 MB/s	
PC Card 16-bit 100 ns byte mode	80 Mbit/s	10 MB/s	
PC Card 16-bit 100 ns word mode	160 Mbit/s	20 MB/s	
PC Card 32-bit (CardBus) byte mode	267 Mbit/s	33.33 MB/s	
ExpressCard 1.2 USB 2.0 mode	480 Mbit/s	60 MB/s	2003
PC Card 32-bit (CardBus) word mode	533 Mbit/s	66.66 MB/s	
PC Card 32-bit (CardBus) doubleword mode	1067 Mbit/s	133.33 MB/s	
ExpressCard 1.2 PCI Express mode	2500 Mbit/s	250 MB/s	2008
ExpressCard 2.0 USB 3.0 mode	4800 Mbit/s	600 MB/s	
ExpressCard 2.0 PCI Express mode	5000 Mbit/s	625 MB/s	2009

==== Storage ====
Technology	Rate		Year
Teletype Model 33 paper tape	80 bit/s	10 B/s	1963
TRS-80 Model 1 Level 1 BASIC cassette tape interface	250 bit/s	32 B/s	1977
C2N Commodore Datasette 1530 cassette tape interface	300 bit/s	15 B/s	1977
Apple II cassette tape interface	1.5 kbit/s	200 B/s	1977
Amstrad CPC tape	2.0 kbit/s	250 B/s	1984
Single Density 8-inch FM Floppy Disk Controller (160 KB)	250 kbit/s	31 KB/s	1973
Single Density 5.25-inch FM Floppy Disk Controller (180 KB)	125 kbit/s	15.5 KB/s	1978
High Density MFM Floppy Disk Controller (1.2 MB/1.44 MB)	250 kbit/s	31 KB/s	1984
CD Controller (1×)	1.171 Mbit/s	0.146 MB/s	1988
MFM hard disk	5 Mbit/s	0.625 MB/s	1980
RLL hard disk	7.5 Mbit/s	0.937 MB/s	
DVD Controller (1×)	11.1 Mbit/s	1.32 MB/s	
Massbus	32 Mbit/s	2 MB/s	1972
ESDI	24 Mbit/s	3 MB/s	
ATA PIO Mode 0	26.4 Mbit/s	3.3 MB/s	1986
HD DVD Controller (1×)	36 Mbit/s	4.5 MB/s	
Blu-ray Controller (1×)	36 Mbit/s	4.5 MB/s	
SCSI (Narrow SCSI) (5 MHz) (Note: SCSI-1, SCSI-2 and SCSI-3 are signaling protocols and do not explicitly refer to a specific rate. Narrow SCSI exists using SCSI-1 and SCSI-2. Higher rates use SCSI-2 or later.)	40 Mbit/s	5 MB/s	1986
ATA PIO Mode 1	41.6 Mbit/s	5.2 MB/s	1994
ATA PIO Mode 2	66.4 Mbit/s	8.3 MB/s	1994
Fast SCSI (8 bits/10 MHz)	80 Mbit/s	10 MB/s	
ATA PIO Mode 3	88.8 Mbit/s	11.1 MB/s	1996
AoE over Fast Ethernet (Note: Minimum overhead is 38 byte L1/L2, 14 byte AoE per 1024 byte user data)	100 Mbit/s	11.9 MB/s	2009
iSCSI over Fast Ethernet (Note: Minimum overhead is 38 byte L1/L2, 20 byte IP, 20 byte TCP per 1460 byte user data)	100 Mbit/s	11.9 MB/s	2004
ATA PIO Mode 4	133.3 Mbit/s	16.7 MB/s	1996
Fast Wide SCSI (16 bits/10 MHz)	160 Mbit/s	20 MB/s	
Ultra SCSI (Fast-20 SCSI) (8 bits/20 MHz)	160 Mbit/s	20 MB/s	
SD (High Speed)	200 Mbit/s	25 MB/s	
Ultra DMA ATA 33	264 Mbit/s	33 MB/s	1998
Ultra Wide SCSI (16 bits/20 MHz)	320 Mbit/s	40 MB/s	
Ultra-2 SCSI 40 (Fast-40 SCSI) (8 bits/40 MHz)	320 Mbit/s	40 MB/s	
SDHC/SDXC/SDUC (UHS-I Full Duplex)	400 Mbit/s	50 MB/s	
Ultra DMA ATA 66	533.6 Mbit/s	66.7 MB/s	2000
Blu-ray Controller (16×)	576 Mbit/s	72 MB/s	
Ultra-2 wide SCSI (16 bits/40 MHz)	640 Mbit/s	80 MB/s	
Serial Storage Architecture SSA	640 Mbit/s	80 MB/s	1990
Ultra DMA ATA 100	800 Mbit/s	100 MB/s	2002
Fibre Channel 1GFC (1.0625 GHz) (Note: Fibre Channel 1GFC, 2GFC, 4GFC use an 8b/10b encoding scheme. Fibre Channel 10GFC, which uses a 64B/66B encoding scheme, is not compatible with 1GFC, 2GFC and 4GFC, and is used only to interconnect switches.)	850 Mbit/s	103.23 MB/s	1997
AoE over gigabit Ethernet, jumbo frames (Note: Minimum overhead is 38 byte L1/L2, 14 byte AoE per 8192 byte user data)	1 Gbit/s	124.2 MB/s	2009
iSCSI over gigabit Ethernet, jumbo frames (Note: Minimum overhead is 38 byte L1/L2, 20 byte IP, 20 byte TCP per 8960 byte user data)	1 Gbit/s	123.9 MB/s	2004
Ultra DMA ATA 133	1.064 Gbit/s	133 MB/s	2005
SDHC/SDXC/SDUC (UHS-II Full Duplex)	1.25 Gbit/s	156 MB/s	
Ultra-3 SCSI (Ultra 160 SCSI; Fast-80 Wide SCSI) (16 bits/40 MHz DDR)	1.28 Gbit/s	160 MB/s	
SATA revision 1.0 (Note: SATA and SAS use an 8b/10b encoding scheme.)	1.500 Gbit/s	150 MB/s ^{[a]}	2003
Fibre Channel 2GFC (2.125 GHz)	1.700 Gbit/s	206.5 MB/s	2001
Ultra-320 SCSI (Ultra4 SCSI) (16 bits/80 MHz DDR)	2.560 Gbit/s	320 MB/s	
Serial Attached SCSI (SAS) SAS-1	3 Gbit/s	300 MB/s ^{[a]}	2004
SATA Revision 2.0	3 Gbit/s	300 MB/s ^{[a]}	2004
SDHC/SDXC/SDUC (UHS-III Full Duplex)	2.5 Gbit/s	312 MB/s	
Fibre Channel 4GFC (4.25 GHz)	3.4 Gbit/s	413 MB/s	2004
Serial Attached SCSI (SAS) SAS-2	6 Gbit/s	600 MB/s ^{[a]}	2009
SATA Revision 3.0	6 Gbit/s	600 MB/s ^{[a]}	2008
Fibre Channel 8GFC (8.50 GHz)	6.8 Gbit/s	826 MB/s	2005
SDHC/SDXC/SDUC (SD Express)	7.9 Gbit/s	985 MB/s	
AoE over 10GbE	10 Gbit/s	1.242 GB/s	2009
iSCSI over 10GbE	10 Gbit/s	1.239 GB/s	2004
FCoE over 10GbE (Note: minimum overhead is 38 byte L1/L2, 36 byte FC per 2048 byte user data)	10 Gbit/s	1.206 GB/s	2009
Serial Attached SCSI (SAS) SAS-3	12 Gbit/s	1.2 GB/s	2013
Fibre Channel 16GFC (14.025 GHz)	13.6 Gbit/s	1.652 GB/s ^{[b]}	2011
SATA Express	16 Gbit/s	2 GB/s	2013
Serial Attached SCSI (SAS) SAS-4	22.5 Gbit/s	2.4 GB/s ^{[c]}	2017
UFS (version 3.0)	23.2 Gbit/s	2.9 GB/s	2018
Fibre Channel 32GFC (28.05 GHz)	26.424 Gbit/s	3.303 GB/s ^{[b]}	2016
NVMe over M.2 or U.2 (using PCI Express 3.0 ×4 link)	32 Gbit/s	3.938 GB/s	2013
iSCSI over InfiniBand 4×	32 Gbit/s	4 GB/s	2007
NVMe over M.2 or U.2 (using PCI Express 4.0 ×4 link)	64 Gbit/s	7.876 GB/s	2017
iSCSI over 100G Ethernet	100 Gbit/s	12.392 GB/s	2010
FCoE over 100G Ethernet	100 Gbit/s	12.064 GB/s	2010
NVMe over M.2, U.2, U.3 or EDSFF (using PCI Express 5.0 ×4 link)	128 Gbit/s	15.754 GB/s	2019

^{a} Uses 8b/10b encoding ^{b} Uses 64b/66b encoding ^{c} Uses 128b/150b encoding

==== Peripheral ====
Technology	Rate		Year
Apple Desktop Bus	10.0 kbit/s	1.25 kB/s	1986
PS/2 port	12.0 kbit/s	1.5 kB/s	1987
Serial MIDI	31.25 kbit/s	3.9 kB/s	1983
CBM Bus max (Note: Proprietary serial version of IEEE-488 by Commodore International)	41.6 kbit/s	5.1 kB/s	1981
Serial RS-232 max	230.4 kbit/s	28.8 kB/s	1962
Serial DMX512A	250.0 kbit/s	31.25 kB/s	1998
Parallel (Centronics/IEEE 1284)	1 Mbit/s	125 kB/s	1970 (standardized 1994)
Serial 16550 UART max	1.5 Mbit/s	187.5 kB/s	
USB 1.0 low speed	1.536 Mbit/s	192 kB/s	1996
Serial UART max	2.7648 Mbit/s	345.6 kB/s	
GPIB/HPIB (IEEE-488.1) IEEE-488 max.	8 Mbit/s	1 MB/s	Late 1960s (standardized 1976)
Serial EIA-422 max.	10 Mbit/s	1.25 MB/s	
USB 1.0 full speed	12 Mbit/s	1.5 MB/s	1996
Parallel (Centronics/IEEE 1284) EPP (Enhanced Parallel Port)	16 Mbit/s	2 MB/s	1992
Parallel (Centronics/IEEE 1284) ECP (Extended Capability Port)	20 Mbit/s	2.5 MB/s	1994
Serial EIA-485 max.	35 Mbit/s	4.375 MB/s	
GPIB/HPIB (IEEE-488.1-2003) IEEE-488 max.	64 Mbit/s	8 MB/s	
FireWire (IEEE 1394) 100	98.304 Mbit/s	12.288 MB/s	1995
FireWire (IEEE 1394) 200	196.608 Mbit/s	24.576 MB/s	1995
FireWire (IEEE 1394) 400	393.216 Mbit/s	49.152 MB/s	1995
USB 2.0 Hi-Speed	480 Mbit/s	60 MB/s	2000
FireWire (IEEE 1394b) 800	786.432 Mbit/s	98.304 MB/s	2002
Fibre Channel 1 Gb SCSI	1.0625 Gbit/s	100 MB/s	
FireWire (IEEE 1394b) 1600	1.573 Gbit/s	196.6 MB/s	2007
Fibre Channel 2 Gb SCSI	2.125 Gbit/s	200 MB/s	
eSATA (SATA 300)	3 Gbit/s	300 MB/s	2004
CoaXPress Base (up and down bidirectional link)	3.125 Gbit/s + 20.833 Mbit/s	390 MB/s	2009
FireWire (IEEE 1394b) 3200	3.1457 Gbit/s	393.216 MB/s	2007
External PCI Express 2.0 ×1	4 Gbit/s	500 MB/s	
Fibre Channel 4 Gb SCSI	4.25 Gbit/s	531.25 MB/s	
USB 5Gbps (USB 3.2 Gen 1×1)	5 Gbit/s	500 MB/s	2010
eSATA (SATA 600)	6 Gbit/s	600 MB/s	2011
CoaXPress full (up and down bidirectional link)	6.25 Gbit/s + 20.833 Mbit/s	781 MB/s	2009
External PCI Express 2.0 ×2	8 Gbit/s	1 GB/s	
USB 10Gbps (USB 3.2 Gen 2×1, USB 3.2 Gen 1×2, USB4 Gen 2×1)	10 Gbit/s	1.212 GB/s	2013
External PCI Express 2.0 ×4	16 Gbit/s	2 GB/s	
Thunderbolt	2 × 10 Gbit/s	2 × 1.25 GB/s	2011
USB 20Gbps (USB 3.2 Gen 2×2, USB4 Gen 2×2, USB4 Gen 3×1)	20 Gbit/s	2.424 GB/s	2017
Thunderbolt 2	20 Gbit/s	2.5 GB/s	2013
FPGA Mezzanine Card Plus (FMC+)	28 Gbit/s	3.5 GB/s	2019
External PCI Express 2.0 ×8	32 Gbit/s	4 GB/s	
USB 40Gbps (USB4 Gen 3×2)	40 Gbit/s	4.8 GB/s	2019
Thunderbolt 3 two links	40 Gbit/s	5 GB/s	2015
Thunderbolt 4	40 Gbit/s	5 GB/s	2020
External PCI Express 2.0 ×16	64 Gbit/s	8 GB/s	
USB 80Gbps (USB4 Gen 4×2)	80 Gbit/s	9.6 GB/s	2022
Thunderbolt 5	80 Gbit/s	9.6 GB/s	2024
USB 120Gbps (USB4 Gen 4 asymmetric 3:1)	120 Gbit/s	14.4 GB/s	2022
Thunderbolt 5 Asymmetric	120 Gbit/s	14.4 GB/s	2024

==== MAC to PHY ====
Technology	Channels	Bits	MGT Lanes			Rate		Year
Technology	Channels	Bits	Count	Encoding	Rate			Year
Media-independent interface (MII)	1	4				100 Mbit/s	12.5 MB/s	
Reduced MII (RMII)	1	2				100 Mbit/s	12.5 MB/s	
Serial MII (SMII)	1	1				100 Mbit/s	12.5 MB/s	
Gigabit MII (GMII)	1	8				1.0 Gbit/s	125 MB/s	
Reduced gigabit/s MII (RGMII)	1	4				1.0 Gbit/s	125 MB/s	
Ten-bit interface (TBI)	1	10				1.0 Gbit/s	125 MB/s	
Serial gigabit/s MII (SGMII)	1		1	8b/10b	1.25 Gbit/s	1.0 Gbit/s	125 MB/s	
Reduced serial gigabit/s MII (RSGMII)	2		1	8b/10b	2.5 Gbit/s	2.0 Gbit/s	250 MB/s	
Reduced serial gigabit/s MII plus (RSGMII-PLUS)	4		1	8b/10b	5.0 Gbit/s	4.0 Gbit/s	500 MB/s	
Quad serial gigabit/s MII (QSGMII)	4		1	8b/10b	5.0 Gbit/s	4.0 Gbit/s	500 MB/s	
10 gigabit/s MII (XGMII)	1	32				10.0 Gbit/s	1.25 GB/s	
XGMII attachment unit interface (XAUI)	1		4	8b/10b	3.125 Gbit/s	10.0 Gbit/s	1.25 GB/s	
Reduced Pin XAUI (RXAUI)	1		2	8b/10b	6.25 Gbit/s	10.0 Gbit/s	1.25 GB/s	
XFI/SFI	1		1	64b/66b	10.3125 Gbit/s	10.0 Gbit/s	1.25 GB/s	
USXGMII	1		1	64b/66b	10.3125 Gbit/s	10.0 Gbit/s	1.25 GB/s	
25 gigabit/s MII (25GMII, on-chip only)	1					25.0 Gbit/s	3.125 GB/s	
25G AUI (25GAUI)	1		1	64b/66b	25.78125 Gbit/s	25.0 Gbit/s	3.125 GB/s	
40 gigabit/s MII (XLGMII, on-chip only)	1					40.0 Gbit/s	5 GB/s	
100 gigabit/s MII (CGMII, on-chip only)	1					100.0 Gbit/s	12.5 GB/s	2008
100G AUI (CAUI-10)	1		10	64b/66b	10.3125 Gbit/s	100.0 Gbit/s	12.5 GB/s	
100G AUI (CAUI-4)	1		4	64b/66b	25.78125 Gbit/s	100.0 Gbit/s	12.5 GB/s	

==== PHY to XPDR ====
Technology	Rate		Year
10 gigabit/s 16-bit interface (XSBI; 16 lanes)	0.995 Gbit/s	0.124 GB/s	

=== Dynamic random-access memory ===
The table below shows values for PC memory module types. These modules usually combine multiple chips on one circuit board. SIMM modules connect to the computer via an 8-bit- or 32-bit-wide interface. RIMM modules used by RDRAM are 16-bit- or 32-bit-wide. DIMM modules connect to the computer via a 64-bit-wide interface. Some other computer architectures use different modules with a different bus width.

In a single-channel configuration, only one module at a time can transfer information to the CPU. In multi-channel configurations, multiple modules can transfer information to the CPU at the same time, in parallel. FPM, EDO, SDR, and RDRAM memory was not commonly installed in a dual-channel configuration. DDR and DDR2 memory is usually installed in single- or dual-channel configuration. DDR3 memory is installed in single-, dual-, tri-, and quad-channel configurations. Bit rates of multi-channel configurations are the product of the module bit-rate (given below) and the number of channels.

Module type	Chip type	Internal clock^{[a]}	Bus clock	Bus speed^{[b]}	Transfer rate	
FPM DRAM	70 ns tRAC	22 MHz	22 MHz	0.0177 GT/s	1.416 Gbit/s	177 MB/s
EDO DRAM (486 CPU)	60 ns tRAC	33 MHz	33 MHz	0.0266 GT/s	2.128 Gbit/s	266 MB/s
EDO DRAM (Pentium CPU)	60 ns tRAC	66 MHz	66 MHz	0.066 GT/s	4.264 Gbit/s	533 MB/s
PC-66 SDR SDRAM	10/15 ns	66 MHz	66 MHz	0.066 GT/s	4.264 Gbit/s	533 MB/s
PC-100 SDR SDRAM	8 ns	100 MHz	100 MHz	0.100 GT/s	6.4 Gbit/s	800 MB/s
PC-133 SDR SDRAM	7/7.5 ns	133 MHz	133 MHz	0.133 GT/s	8.528 Gbit/s	1.066 GB/s
RIMM-1200 RDRAM	PC600	75 MHz	300 MHz	0.600 GT/s	9.6 Gbit/s	1.2 GB/s
RIMM-1400 RDRAM	PC700	87.5 MHz	350 MHz	0.700 GT/s	11.2 Gbit/s	1.4 GB/s
RIMM-1600 RDRAM	PC800	100 MHz	400 MHz	0.800 GT/s	12.8 Gbit/s	1.6 GB/s
PC-1600 DDR SDRAM	DDR-200	100 MHz	100 MHz	0.200 GT/s	12.8 Gbit/s	1.6 GB/s
RIMM-2100 RDRAM	PC1066	133 MHz	533 MHz	1.066 GT/s	17.034 Gbit/s	2.133 GB/s
PC-2100 DDR SDRAM	DDR-266	133 MHz	133 MHz	0.266 GT/s	17.034 Gbit/s	2.133 GB/s
RIMM-2400 RDRAM	PC1200	150 MHz	600 MHz	1.2 GT/s	19.2 Gbit/s	2.4 GB/s
PC-2700 DDR SDRAM	DDR-333	166 MHz	166 MHz	0.333 GT/s	21.336 Gbit/s	2.667 GB/s
PC-3200 DDR SDRAM	DDR-400	200 MHz	200 MHz	0.400 GT/s	25.6 Gbit/s	3.2 GB/s
PC2-3200 DDR2 SDRAM	DDR2-400	100 MHz	200 MHz	0.400 GT/s	25.6 Gbit/s	3.2 GB/s
PC-3500 DDR SDRAM	DDR-433	216 MHz	216 MHz	0.433 GT/s	27.728 Gbit/s	3.466 GB/s
PC-3700 DDR SDRAM	DDR-466	233 MHz	233 MHz	0.466 GT/s	29.864 Gbit/s	3.733 GB/s
PC-4000 DDR SDRAM	DDR-500	250 MHz	250 MHz	0.500 GT/s	32 Gbit/s	4 GB/s
PC-4200 DDR SDRAM	DDR-533	266 MHz	266 MHz	0.533 GT/s	34.128 Gbit/s	4.266 GB/s
PC2-4200 DDR2 SDRAM	DDR2-533	133 MHz	266 MHz	0.533 GT/s	34.128 Gbit/s	4.266 GB/s
PC-4400 DDR SDRAM	DDR-550	275 MHz	275 MHz	0.550 GT/s	35.2 Gbit/s	4.4 GB/s
PC-4800 DDR SDRAM	DDR-600	300 MHz	300 MHz	0.600 GT/s	38.4 Gbit/s	4.8 GB/s
PC2-5300 DDR2 SDRAM	DDR2-667	166 MHz	333 MHz	0.667 GT/s	42.664 Gbit/s	5.333 GB/s
PC2-6000 DDR2 SDRAM	DDR2-750	188 MHz	375 MHz	0.750 GT/s	48 Gbit/s	6 GB/s
PC2-6400 DDR2 SDRAM	DDR2-800	200 MHz	400 MHz	0.800 GT/s	51.2 Gbit/s	6.4 GB/s
PC3-6400 DDR3 SDRAM	DDR3-800	100 MHz	400 MHz	0.800 GT/s	51.2 Gbit/s	6.4 GB/s
PC2-7200 DDR2 SDRAM	DDR2-900	225 MHz	450 MHz	0.900 GT/s	57.6 Gbit/s	7.2 GB/s
PC2-8000 DDR2 SDRAM	DDR2-1000	250 MHz	500 MHz	1 GT/s	64 Gbit/s	8 GB/s
PC2-8500 DDR2 SDRAM	DDR2-1066	266 MHz	533 MHz	1.066 GT/s	68 Gbit/s	8.5 GB/s
PC3-8500 DDR3 SDRAM	DDR3-1066	133 MHz	533 MHz	1.066 GT/s	68 Gbit/s	8.5 GB/s
PC2-8800 DDR2 SDRAM	DDR2-1100	275 MHz	550 MHz	1.1 GT/s	70.4 Gbit/s	8.8 GB/s
PC2-9200 DDR2 SDRAM	DDR2-1150	288 MHz	575 MHz	1.15 GT/s	73.6 Gbit/s	9.2 GB/s
PC2-9600 DDR2 SDRAM	DDR2-1200	300 MHz	600 MHz	1.2 GT/s	76.8 Gbit/s	9.6 GB/s
PC2-10000 DDR2 SDRAM	DDR2-1250	312 MHz	625 MHz	1.25 GT/s	80 Gbit/s	10 GB/s
PC3-10600 DDR3 SDRAM	DDR3-1333	167 MHz	667 MHz	1.333 GT/s	85.336 Gbit/s	10.667 GB/s
PC3-11000 DDR3 SDRAM	DDR3-1375	172 MHz	688 MHz	1.375 GT/s	88 Gbit/s	11 GB/s
PC3-12800 DDR3 SDRAM	DDR3-1600	200 MHz	800 MHz	1.6 GT/s	102.4 Gbit/s	12.8 GB/s
PC3-13000 DDR3 SDRAM	DDR3-1625	203 MHz	813 MHz	1.625 GT/s	104 Gbit/s	13 GB/s
PC3-14400 DDR3 SDRAM	DDR3-1800	225 MHz	900 MHz	1.8 GT/s	115.2 Gbit/s	14.4 GB/s
PC3-14900 DDR3 SDRAM	DDR3-1866	233 MHz	933 MHz	1.866 GT/s	119.464 Gbit/s	14.933 GB/s
PC3-16000 DDR3 SDRAM	DDR3-2000	250 MHz	1000 MHz	2 GT/s	128 Gbit/s	16 GB/s
PC3-17000 DDR3 SDRAM	DDR3-2133	267 MHz	1067 MHz	2.133 GT/s	136.528 Gbit/s	17.066 GB/s
PC4-17000 DDR4 SDRAM	DDR4-2133	267 MHz	1067 MHz	2.133 GT/s	136.5 Gbit/s	17 GB/s
PC3-17600 DDR3 SDRAM	DDR3-2200	275 MHz	1100 MHz	2.2 GT/s	140.8 Gbit/s	17.6 GB/s
PC3-19200 DDR3 SDRAM	DDR3-2400	300 MHz	1200 MHz	2.4 GT/s	153.6 Gbit/s	19.2 GB/s
PC4-19200 DDR4 SDRAM	DDR4-2400	300 MHz	1200 MHz	2.4 GT/s	153.6 Gbit/s	19.2 GB/s
PC3-21300 DDR3 SDRAM	DDR3-2666	333 MHz	1333 MHz	2.666 GT/s	170.5 Gbit/s	21.3 GB/s
PC4-21300 DDR4 SDRAM	DDR4-2666	333 MHz	1333 MHz	2.666 GT/s	170.5 Gbit/s	21.3 GB/s
PC3-24000 DDR3 SDRAM	DDR3-3000	375 MHz	1500 MHz	3.0 GT/s	192 Gbit/s	24 GB/s
PC4-24000 DDR4 SDRAM	DDR4-3000	375 MHz	1500 MHz	3.0 GT/s	192 Gbit/s	24 GB/s
PC4-25600 DDR4 SDRAM	DDR4-3200	400 MHz	1600 MHz	3.2 GT/s	204.8 Gbit/s	25.6 GB/s
PC5-41600 DDR5 SDRAM	DDR5-5200	650 MHz	2600 MHz	5.2 GT/s	332.8 Gbit/s	41.6 GB/s
PC5-44800 DDR5 SDRAM	DDR5-5600	700 MHz	2800 MHz	5.6 GT/s	358.4 Gbit/s	44.8 GB/s
PC5-51200 DDR5 SDRAM	DDR5-6400	800 MHz	3200 MHz	6.4 GT/s	409.6 Gbit/s	51.2 GB/s
PC5-57600 DDR5 SDRAM	DDR5-7200	900 MHz	3600 MHz	7.2 GT/s	460.8 Gbit/s	57.6 GB/s
PC5-64000 DDR5 SDRAM	DDR5-8000	1000 MHz	4000 MHz	8.0 GT/s	512.0 Gbit/s	64.0 GB/s
PC5-70400 DDR5 SDRAM	DDR5-8800	1100 MHz	4400 MHz	8.8 GT/s	563.2 Gbit/s	70.4 GB/s

^{a} The clock rate at which DRAM memory cells operate. The memory latency is largely determined by this rate. Note that until the introduction of DDR4 the internal clock rate saw relatively slow progress. DDR/DDR2/DDR3 memory uses 2n/4n/8n (respectively) prefetch buffer to provide higher throughput, while the internal memory speed remains similar to that of the previous generation.

^{b} The memory speed or clock rate advertised by manufactures and suppliers usually refers to this rate (with 1 GT/s = 1 GHz). Note that modern types of memory use DDR bus with two transfers per clock.

=== Graphics processing units' RAM ===
RAM memory modules are also utilised by graphics processing units; however, memory modules for those differ somewhat from standard computer memory, particularly with lower power requirements, and are specialised to serve GPUs: for example, GDDR3 was fundamentally based on DDR2. Every graphics memory chip is directly connected to the GPU (point-to-point). The total GPU memory bus width varies with the number of memory chips and the number of lanes per chip. For example, GDDR5 specifies either 16 or 32 lanes per device (chip), while GDDR5X specifies 64 lanes per chip. Over the years, bus widths rose from 64-bit to 512-bit and beyond: e.g. HBM is 1024 bits wide. Because of this variability, graphics memory speeds are sometimes compared per pin. For direct comparison to the values for 64-bit modules shown above, video RAM is compared here in 64-lane lots, corresponding to two chips for those devices with 32-bit widths. In 2012, high-end GPUs used 8 or even 12 chips with 32 lanes each, for a total memory bus width of 256 or 384 bits. Combined with a transfer rate per pin of 5 GT/s or more, such cards could reach 240 GB/s or more.

RAM frequencies used for a given chip technology vary greatly. Where single values are given below, they are examples from high-end cards. Since many cards have more than one pair of chips, the total bandwidth is correspondingly higher. For example, high-end cards often have eight chips, each 32 bits wide, so the total bandwidth for such cards is four times the value given below.

Chip type	Module type	Memory clock	Transfers/s	Bandwidth	
DDR	64 lanes	350 MHz	0.7 GT/s	44.8 Gbit/s	5.6 GB/s
DDR2	64 lanes	250 MHz	1 GT/s	64 Gbit/s	8 GB/s
GDDR3	64 lanes	625 MHz	2.5 GT/s	159 Gbit/s	19.9 GB/s
GDDR4	64 lanes	275 MHz	2.2 GT/s	140.8 Gbit/s	17.6 GB/s
GDDR5	64 lanes	625–1125 MHz	5–9 GT/s	320–576 Gbit/s	40–72 GB/s
GDDR5X	64 lanes	625–875 MHz	10–12 GT/s	640–768 Gbit/s	80–96 GB/s
GDDR6	64 lanes	875–1125 MHz	14–18 GT/s	896–1152 Gbit/s	112–144 GB/s
GDDR6X	64 lanes	594–656 MHz	19–21 GT/s	1216–1344 Gbit/s	152–168 GB/s
HBM	1024 lanes (per stack)	500 MHz	1 GT/s	1024 Gbit/s	128 GB/s
HBM2	1024 lanes (per stack)	1000 MHz	2 GT/s	2048 Gbit/s	256 GB/s
HBM2e	1024 lanes (per stack)	1800 MHz	3.6 GT/s	3686.4 Gbit/s	460.8 GB/s
HBM3	1024 lanes (per stack)	3200 MHz	6.4 GT/s	6553.6 Gbit/s	819.2 GB/s
HBM3E	1024 lanes (per stack)	4900 MHz	9.8 GT/s	9832 Gbit/s	1229 GB/s
HMC	128 lanes (8 links @ 16 lanes ea)	(internal)	10 GT/s	2560 Gbit/s	320 GB/s
HMC2	64 lanes (4 links @ 16 lanes ea)	(internal)	30 GT/s	3840 Gbit/s	480 GB/s
HBM4	2048 lanes (per stack)	4000 MHz	8 GT/s	16384 Gbit/s	2048 GB/s

=== Digital audio ===
Device	Rate	
CD Audio (16-bit PCM)	1.411 Mbit/s	176.4 kB/s
I²S	2.250 Mbit/s @ 24bit/48 kHz	0.281 MB/s
AES/EBU	2.625 Mbit/s @ 24-bit/48 kHz	0.328 MB/s
S/PDIF fs 48kHz	3.072 Mbit/s	0.384 MB/s
ADAT Lightpipe (Type I)	9.216 Mbit/s	1.152 MB/s
AC'97	12.288 Mbit/s	1.536 MB/s
HDMI	36.864 Mbit/s	4.608 MB/s
DisplayPort	36.864 Mbit/s	4.608 MB/s
Intel High Definition Audio rev. 1.0	48 Mbit/s outbound; 24 Mbit/s inbound	6 MB/s outbound; 3 MB/s inbound
MADI	100 Mbit/s	12.5 MB/s

=== Digital video interconnects ===
Data rates given are from the video source (e.g., video card) to receiving device (e.g., monitor) only. Out of band and reverse signaling channels are not included.

Device	Rate		Year
HD-SDI (SMPTE 292M)	1.485 Gbit/s	0.186 GB/s	
Camera Link Base (single) 24-bit 85 MHz	2.040 Gbit/s	0.255 GB/s	
LVDS Display Interface	2.80 Gbit/s	0.35 GB/s	
3G-SDI (SMPTE 424M)	2.97 Gbit/s	0.371 GB/s	2006
Single link DVI	4.95 Gbit/s	0.619 GB/s ^{[a]}	1999
HDMI 1.0	4.95 Gbit/s	0.619 GB/s ^{[a]}	2002
Camera Link full (dual) 64-bit 85 MHz	5.44 Gbit/s	0.680 GB/s	
6G-SDI (SMPTE 2081)	5.94 Gbit/s	0.75 GB/s	2015
DisplayPort 1.0 (4-lane Reduced Bit Rate)	6.48 Gbit/s	0.810 GB/s ^{[a]}	2006
Dual link DVI	9.90 Gbit/s	1.238 GB/s ^{[a]}	1999
Thunderbolt	2 × 10 Gbit/s	2 × 1.25 GB/s	2011
HDMI 1.3	10.2 Gbit/s	1.275 GB/s ^{[a]}	2006
Dual High-Speed LVDS Display Interface	10.5 Gbit/s	1.312 GB/s	
DisplayPort 1.0 (4-lane High Bit Rate)	10.8 Gbit/s	1.35 GB/s ^{[a]}	2006
12G-SDI (SMPTE 2082)	11.88 Gbit/s	1.5 GB/s	2015
HDMI 2.0	18.0 Gbit/s	2.25 GB/s ^{[a]}	2013
Thunderbolt 2	20 Gbit/s	2.5 GB/s	2013
DisplayPort 1.2 (4-lane High Bit Rate 2)	21.6 Gbit/s	2.7 GB/s ^{[a]}	2009
DisplayPort 1.3 (4-lane High Bit Rate 3)	32.4 Gbit/s	4.05 GB/s ^{[a]}	2014 (2016)
DisplayPort 1.4/1.4a	32.4 Gbit/s	4.05 GB/s	2016 (2018)
superMHL	36 Gbit/s	4.5 GB/s	2015
Thunderbolt 3	40 Gbit/s	5 GB/s	2015
HDMI 2.1	48 Gbit/s	6 GB/s ^{[b]}	2017
DisplayPort 2.0/2.1 (4-lane)	80 Gbit/s	10 GB/s ^{[c]}	2019 (2022)
SMPTE 2110 over 100 Gigabit Ethernet	100 Gbit/s	12.5 GB/s	2017
HDMI 2.2	96 Gbit/s	12 GB/s ^{[b]}	2025

^{a} Uses 8b/10b encoding (20% coding overhead) ^{b} Uses 16b/18b encoding (11% overhead) ^{c} Uses 128b/132b encoding (3% overhead)

== See also ==
- List of Internet access technology bit rates
- Bitrates in multimedia
- Comparison of mobile phone standards
- List of wireless network protocols
- OFDM system comparison table
- Optical Carrier transmission rates
- Orders of magnitude (bit rate)
- Sneakernet
- Spectral efficiency comparison table
