= Calix, Inc. =

Telecommunications company

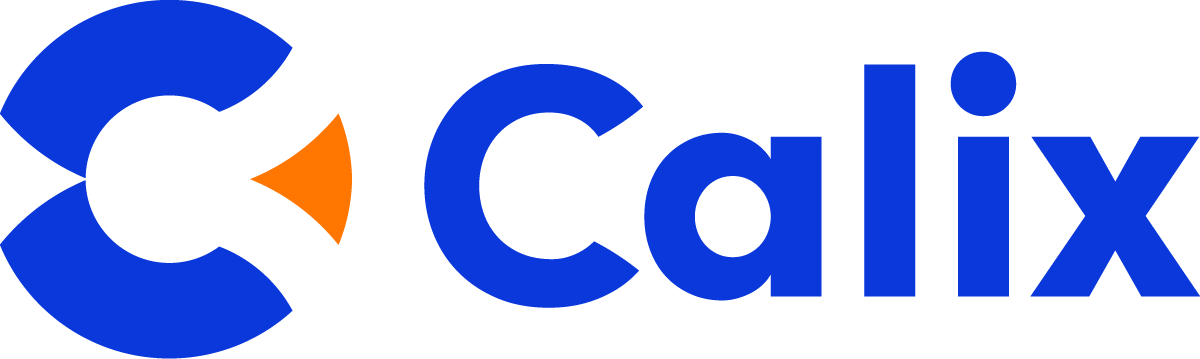
- Type: Public company
- Traded as: NYSE: CALX; S&P 600 component
- Founded: 1999; 27 years ago
- Headquarters: San Jose, California, U.S.
- Key people: Chairman & Founder: Carl Russo; President & CEO: Michael Weening; CFO: Cory Sindelar; CPO: Shane Eleniak; CSO: Martha Galley; COO: John Derocher
- Products: 10G-PON, NG-PON2, 50G-PON, DSLAM, broadband access, IPTV, VOIP, GPON, active Ethernet, SMART home technology
- Services: Broadband Communication Services
- Revenue: US$1.0 billion (2025) ()
- Number of employees: 1,921 (2025)
- Website: www.calix.com

Calix, Inc. is a telecommunications company that specializes in providing software platforms, systems, and services to support the delivery of broadband services. The company was founded in 1999 and is headquartered in San Jose, California.

Calix was formerly known as Calix Networks Inc. The company provides cloud, software platforms, systems and services to internet service providers.

Calix maintains facilities in Petaluma, CA, Minneapolis, MN, San Jose, CA, Richardson, TX in the US and facilities in Nanjing, China and Bengaluru, India.

In 2024, Orangeburg County Council in South Carolina approved a contract with Calix Inc. to expand broadband service lines in the Neeses and Cope areas as part of a federally supported rural broadband project.

Calix One is a cloud-based software platform used by communications service providers to manage broadband access networks and subscriber services.

Announced in October 2025 and generally available in February 2026, it integrates Calix's earlier Service Cloud, Engagement Cloud, and Network Cloud products and was developed in partnership with Google Cloud.

By mid-February 2026, about 500 of Calix's roughly 1,500 service-provider customers were using the Calix One platform. Operators using it include ALLO Communications, Conexon Connect and Tombigbee Fiber.

In October 2026, Calix released a communications language model on Hugging Face and said it planned to introduce specialised versions, called Calix Gems, in 2027, initially for security threat detection, subscriber experience and network troubleshooting.

== Acquisitions history ==
- In 2006, Calix purchased Optical Solutions, Inc., based in Minneapolis, MN.
- In 2010, Calix announced acquisition of one-time rival Occam Networks, Inc., based in Santa Barbara, California. The acquisition was completed in February 2011.
- In November 2012, Calix completed acquisition of Ericsson’s fiber access assets.
- In January 2018, Verizon Communications selected Calix's AXOS E9-2 system for the first large-scale deployment of NG-PON2 technology, beginning in Tampa, Florida.

== Awards and recognition ==
In 2022, Forbes named Calix in its annual list of America's best mid-sized companies. In 2023, Calix received a Gold Stevie Award in the Workforce Development category at the American Business Awards. In 2024, Light Reading recognized Calix in its Leading Lights Awards 2024 finalists list.

In 2025, Calix was included in Fast Company’s list of the World’s Most Innovative Companies in the enterprise category.

== Industry News ==
- Wiggers, Kyle (October 29, 2018). "Amazon expands white-box Alexa device lineup with new home hub and gateway hardware". VentureBeat.
- How boot camps are helping to address the historic gap in internet access on US tribal lands
- Companies are Thinking All Wrong About Culture
- Democracy In The Cloud: Rural Broadband And The Digitization Of American Life
- Speed Alone is Not A Winning Strategy
