= Churn =

Churn may refer to:

== Dairy-product terms ==
- Butter churn, device for churning butter
- Churning (butter), the process of creating butter out of milk or cream
- Milk churn, container for milk transportation

== Geography ==
- Devils Churn, Pacific inlet in Lincoln County, Oregon, U.S.
- England:
  - River Churn, river running through Gloucestershire
  - Churn railway station (inactive)
- British Columbia, Canada:
  - Churn Creek
  - Churn Creek Provincial Park, in Churn Creek Protected Area

== Music ==
- Churn (Shihad album), 1993
- Churn (Seven Mary Three album), 1994

== Computing ==
- DHCP churn or IP churn in a computer network is the rate at which hosts change IP addresses.

== Business ==
- Product churning, a business practice whereby more of the product is sold than is beneficial to the consumer
- Churning (finance), the excessive buying and selling of a client's stocks by a trader to generate large commission fees
- Churn rate, a measure of the number of individuals or items moving into or out of a collective over a specific period of time.

== Other ==
- Churn drill, large-diameter drilling machine for holes in the ground
- Chuck Churn (1930–2017), American baseball player
- Churning (cipher), an encryption function used in the ITU G.983.1 standard
