= Annex L =

Annex L may refer to:

- Annex L, a revised name for the management system standard Annex SL in use since 2019
- G.992.3 Annex L, an optional telecommunications standard
