= Mahi Networks =

Mahi Networks was a Petaluma, California-based venture-funded network equipment startup company. It was founded in 1999 and focused on developing carrier-class multiservice switching platforms for metro and regional networks.

Mahi's flagship product, the Mi7 Metro Core Aggregation System, was a 320 Gbit/s multi-service switching system supporting SONET/SDH TDM switching, MPLS/Ethernet switching, and IP routing. Its multi-service capability was achieved using a switching fabric based on the Tiny Tera architecture.

== Technology ==
Architecture of the Mi7 Metro Core Aggregation System (MCAS), illustrating integration of DS-3, SONET/SDH, and Ethernet layers within a central office.

At the core of Mahi’s product line was the Mi7 Metro Core Aggregation System (MCAS) — a converged platform combining SONET/SDH add/drop multiplexing, Layer 2 Ethernet switching, and a GMPLS-based control plane. The system was designed to simplify metro and regional central office architectures by replacing stacked MSPPs, DSX panels, and manual cross-connects with software-configurable, high-density optical and electrical interconnects.

The Mi7 system integrated multiple subsystems, including:

- Optical Node Interconnection (ONX): Eliminated coax and DS3 cabling, enabling software-controlled cross-connects and reducing points of failure.
- SONET Ring Aggregation (SRA): Consolidated SONET/SDH ADM functionality to reduce space, power, and operational overhead.
- Metro Ethernet Transport (MET): Enabled carrier-class Ethernet services by integrating Layer 1 transport with Layer 2 statistical multiplexing and VLAN processing.
- Automated Transport Network (ATN): Used a GMPLS mesh architecture for automated A-to-Z provisioning across a dynamic, multi-vendor optical topology.

The system supported interface options ranging from DS3 to OC-192 and Gigabit Ethernet, with scalability features like tributary expansion shelves and pay-as-you-grow pricing. Mahi positioned the Mi7 as an enabler for converged service delivery—supporting legacy TDM, IP VPNs, and video over packet—with lower capital and operational costs.

=== Switching Fabric ===
The Mi7 system’s switching fabric was based on the Tiny Tera architecture, a 320 Gbit/s input-queued packet switch developed at Stanford University. The Tiny Tera design used a sliced crossbar architecture with centralized scheduling and high-speed serial links, allowing extremely high throughput using commercially available CMOS technology.

Mahi Networks adapted this architecture to support a combination of TDM (SONET/SDH) and packet (Ethernet/MPLS/IP) services in metro and regional networks. Key features included:

- Input-queued architecture with virtual output queuing to eliminate head-of-line blocking
- A centralized scheduler implementing fast arbitration algorithms such as iSLIP for near-100% throughput
- Use of high-speed chip-to-chip serial links to simplify the switch's physical interconnect and reduce power and board complexity
- Support for multicast scheduling and fanout-splitting, allowing efficient packet duplication across multiple destinations
- A modular, scalable fabric composed of crossbar slices and port processors, enabling pay-as-you-grow deployment

This approach enabled Mahi to build a cost-effective, high-performance switching core suitable for converged transport across telecom central offices.

== Acquisition ==
In 2005, Mahi Networks was acquired by Meriton Networks, a Canadian optical networking company seeking to enhance its product portfolio with metro switching technologies. Meriton was subsequently acquired by Xtera Communications in 2008, placing Mahi’s technology in the lineage of metro optical innovations adopted by Tier 1 carriers.

== Legacy ==
Mahi Networks was among the early innovators of packet-optical convergence, with its Mi7 platform targeting challenges in scalability, automation, and service flexibility. Its architecture—focused on collapsing network layers and reducing manual provisioning—foreshadowed broader industry shifts toward software-defined networking (SDN) and carrier-class Ethernet transport in metropolitan networks.

The company was also part of the broader Telecom Valley, a cluster of telecommunications startups and technology firms centered in Petaluma’s Redwood Business Park in Sonoma County, California. Mahi contributed to the area's reputation as a hub of telecom innovation during the late 1990s and early 2000s.

Other notable companies that emerged from Telecom Valley include Cerent Corporation, a startup acquired by Cisco Systems in 1999 for $6.9 billion, and AFC, a Petaluma-based fiber access company that was sold for $1.9 billion in 2004.
