= G.992.3 Annex J =

ITU-T Recommendation

Annex J
- Status: In force
- Organization: ITU-T
- Base standards: G.992.3
- Domain: telecommunications
- License: Freely available
- Website: https://www.itu.int/rec/T-REC-G.992.3/

Annex J is a specification in ITU-T Recommendations G.992.3 and G.992.5 for all digital mode ADSL with improved spectral compatibility with ADSL over ISDN, which means that it is a type of naked DSL which will not disturb existing Annex B ADSL services in the same cable binder.

This specification has the same upstream/downstream frequency split of 276 kHz as Annex B, but does not have lower frequency limit of 138 kHz, allowing upstream bandwidth to be increased from 1.8 Mbit/s to 3.5 Mbit/s. This is similar to Annex M, but Annex J can not have POTS on the same line.

Deutsche Telekom started deploying Annex J in 2011, Vodafone Germany followed suit in April 2015 (marketed as quality improvements).

Frequency plan for common ADSL standards and annexes. Legend POTS/ISDN Guard Band Upstream Downstream ADSL/ADSL2 Additional Downstream ADSL2+
