= UDSL =

UDSL may mean:

- University of Dayton School of Law
- Uni-DSL
