= G.992.5 Annex M =

ITU-T Recommendation

Annex M
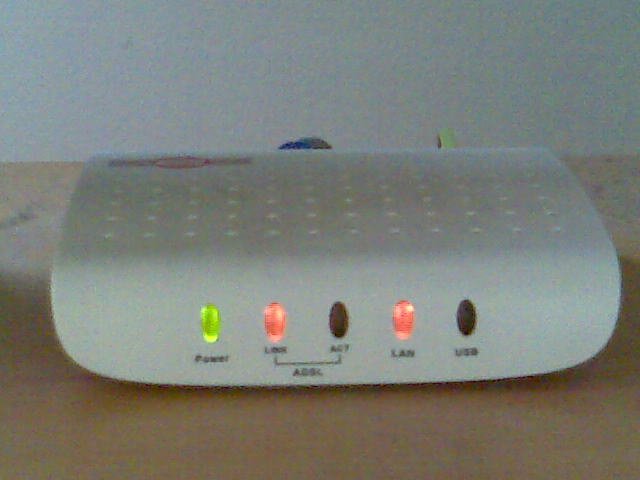
- Status: In force
- Latest version: 1.2; April 2004
- Organization: ITU-T
- Related standards: G.992.5
- Domain: telecommunications
- License: Freely available
- Website: https://www.itu.int/rec/T-REC-G.992.5/

Annex M is an optional specification in ITU-T recommendations G.992.3 (ADSL2) and G.992.5 (ADSL2+), also referred to as ADSL2 M and ADSL2+ M. This specification extends the capability of commonly deployed Annex A by more than doubling the number of upstream bits. The data rates can be as high as 12 or 24 Mbit/s downstream and 3 Mbit/s upstream depending on the distance from the DSLAM to the customer's premises.

The main difference between this specification and Annex A is that the upstream/downstream frequency split has been shifted from 138 kHz up to 276 kHz (as in Annex B/Annex J), allowing upstream bandwidth to be increased from 1.4 Mbit/s to 3.3 Mbit/s, with a corresponding decrease in download bandwidth.

Frequency plan for common ADSL standards and annexes Legend POTS/ISDN Guard Band Upstream Downstream ADSL/ADSL2 Additional Downstream ADSL2+

This standard was approved for deployment on Australian networks by the Australian Communications Industry Forum (ACIF).

== See also ==
- ADSL2
- ADSL2+
