= G.983 =

ITU-T Recommendation

- Broadband Passive Optical Networks (BPON)
- Status: In force
- Latest version: (05/07); May 2007
- Organization: ITU-T, ITU-T Study Group 15
- Related standards: G.984, 10G-PON, NG-PON2
- Domain: telecommunication
- License: Freely available
- Website: https://www.itu.int/rec/T-REC-G.983.2

ITU-T Recommendation G.983 is a family of recommendations that defines broadband passive optical network (BPON) for telecommunications Access networks. It originally comprised ten recommendations, G.983.1 through G.983.10, but recommendations .6–.10 were withdrawn when their content was incorporated into G.983.2. The current view is that the BPON standards are mature, and no further work will be done on them after the 2007 round. The GPON OMCI definition has been revised to stand alone, rather than citing G.983.2.

Although G.983 is directed at BPON, the GPON recommendations draw heavily on it, especially G.984.4, which defines the management model for GPON ONTs.

== Current recommendations ==
The current recommendations are:

- G.983.1, Broadband optical access systems based on passive optical networks (PON), 2005, with amendment 1 and erratum 1. Includes the definition of the churning cipher.
- G.983.2, ONT management and control interface specification for B-PON, 2005, with amendments 1 and 2, erratum 1 and an implementer's guide.
- G.983.3, A broadband optical access system with increased service capability by wavelength allocation, 2001, with amendments 1 and 2.
- G.983.4, A broadband optical access system with increased service capability using dynamic bandwidth assignment, 2001, with amendment 1 and corrigendum 1.
- G.983.5, A broadband optical access system with enhanced survivability, 2002.
