= Telecom Valley =

Coordinates: 38°14′45″N 122°37′53″W

Telecom Valley was an area located in Sonoma County, California specifically the Redwood Business Park of Petaluma, California.

== History ==
Telecom Valley is the term for the North San Francisco Bay Area Highway 101 corridor between Petaluma and Santa Rosa in Northern California.

== Derivation ==
It was derived from its South Bay Area cousin Silicon Valley. In 1969, Don Green, later nicknamed the "Father of Telecom Valley", founded Digital Telephone Systems (DTS) in San Rafael, CA. It is considered the original seed for Telecom Valley which developed farther north in Sonoma County driven by lower cost facilities and housing. Digital Telephone Systems was an early innovator in the Telecom Equipment arena developing a Digital loop carrier (DLC) and digital Private Branch Exchange systems. Bell Labs and Western Electric, the R&D and manufacturing arms of the original AT&T Bell System dominated the DLC markets with the SLC-96 and SLC series 5 systems prior to the 1984 Bell System divestiture. Digital Telephone Systems was purchased by Farinon Corporation which was subsequently acquired by Harris Corporation of Melbourne, Florida in 1980.

== Optilink ==
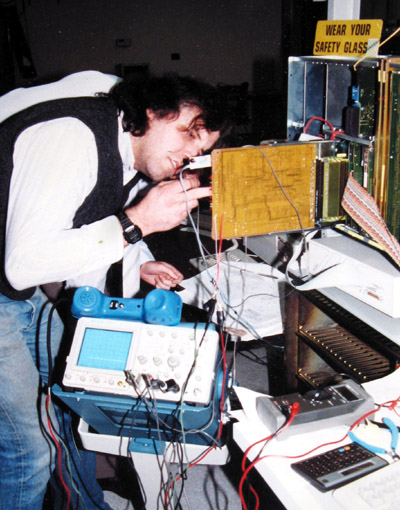
An engineer working on an Optilink Litespan in the late 1980s

Genesis - Prior to the founding of Optilink, Don Green was the CEO of Digital Telephone Systems (DTS) until July 1987. DTS had been acquired twice during Don's tenure, first by Farinon and then again by Harris Corporation. Tom Eames was a principal engineer, manager and system architect at DTS in 1987. In early 1987, Don Green approached Tom and asked him if he would technically evaluate a startup opportunity that had been presented to Don by Venture Capitalist (VC) business associates. Two entrepreneurs had approached the VCs with a business opportunity with the Regional Bell Operating Companies (RBOC). The RBOCs had recently gone through divestiture from AT&T in 1984 and were looking at their future without Bell Labs. They had worked for Pacific Bell and a consulting company who Pacific Bell had hired to study their future strategy in the Access Network between the Central Office and customer premises. This consulting report had envisioned the future need for fiber in the Telco Access Network and described broadly an integrated and intelligent fiber terminal to replace the existing fiber multiplexing equipment and the Digital Loop Carrier (DLC). It further envisioned integration of work being done at Bellcore who was the RBOC's new research group derived from Bell Labs. It suggested it must have dramatically enhanced integration, bandwidth, intelligence, standards compliance and performance. These entrepreneurs had made a very high level presentation of a system design to the VCs. Since it had been many years since Don was involved in system design, he asked Tom to meet with them for a presentation to evaluate their ideas at a hotel at the San Francisco Airport. Most of the presentation was slides taken from the consulting report reviewing the macro-opportunity followed by some simplistic architecture concept slides. Tom had just completed architecture and design work on the H20/20 Digital PABX. Both the market opportunity and a vision of the implementation seemed obvious in the H20/20 experience context. It was also clear the entrepreneurs had little system design experience. Tom returned from the meeting, and reported to Don that this was an intriguing and fabulous opportunity and the DTS H20/20 team already had most of the expertise to realize the vision. Don returned this report to the VCs and Optilink was soon born.

Don Green along with a management and the key technical team from Harris Digital Telephone Systems founded Optilink in Petaluma, California in 1987. Green's co-founder was Al Negrin. Key early employees in addition to Eames were Dave Ehreth who was Director of Engineering, Dave Malloy who led the software development and Chet Stephens who was the first VP of Sales. All were former employees of Green's at Harris. Optilink is viewed as the main branch which led to the many subsequent telecom equipment suppliers that was part of the genesis of term Telecom Valley. In 1984, the Bell System divestiture created the 7 Regional Bell Operating Company (RBOC) structure that were no longer constrained to placing AT&T's Bell Labs and Western Electric products in their networks. This created a multibillion-dollar market opportunity for new equipment suppliers including DLCs. It was this opportunity that was the underlying impetus for the formation of Optilink. The divestiture created a new common RBOC-owned research and engineering company known as Bellcore that began defining its views on the next generation of network technologies including DLCs through its GR-303 interface specification and other documents. Optilink received its initial round of funding after hiring George Hawley, author of the GR-303 specification and former Bell Labs Department Head responsible for planning the SLC-5 DLC System for AT&T. Hawley created the Optilink product road map that Ehreth, Eames, and Malloy developed. Known as the Litespan-2000, this system came to define the class of products known as Next Generation Digital Loop Carrier Systems or NGDLC.

== Decoupling ==
This interface decoupled Telephone Exchange or Switching Systems such as the AT&T 5ESS and Northern Telecom DMS-100 from a slave subtending DLC. That meant the switching equipment suppliers could not monopolize the DLC due to the opening of the interface to other equipment suppliers. This made the nearly $2B DLC market a key telecom equipment product target. In the same mid-1980s time frame, the ANSI T1 standards body began defining a new fiber optic interface standard that came to be known as SONET or Synchronous Optical Networking in the US. Optilink was formed to develop a Next Generation Digital Loop Carrier (NGDLC) targeted at the Bell System and was partly based on the combination of Telcordia GR-303 and SONET integrated into a more advanced DLC. The Optilink architecture that combined Telcordia GR-303 and the ANSI standard SONET then became the de facto definition of the NGDLC. This in turn led to acceptance and deployment of the Optilink NGDLC by all 7 RBOCs plus the large independent GTE.

== Acquisition ==
Optilink was acquired by the mid-sized DSC Communications of Plano, Texas in 1990, which was later bought by the large French multinational telecom supplier Alcatel who then merged in 2006 with the Bell Lab's sister company, Lucent forming Alcatel-Lucent. DSC and Alcatel together drove Optilink's Litespan 2000 NGDLC sales to one of the largest deployments in telecom system's history with its telephone lines served crossing the 50 million mark in 2000 according to Alcatel in 2003. Telecom Valley might also be referred to as DLC Valley since its lineage began the market assault on the Bell System SLC-96 DLC market dominance in 1969 at DTS, then won a dominant position through Optilink and Advanced Fibre Communications (now Tellabs) and now the reigns are being passed to Calix and their series of broadband DLCs. Telecom Valley has dominated the Digital loop carrier marketplace in the US as few other areas in the world have dominated a major telecom system. Telecom Valley is closing in on having provided one fourth of the US population (over 300 million) with 75 million telephone lines. This achievement will assure the Optilink/DSC/Acatel Litespan families 50 million telephone lines in 2000 plus another 9 years of Litespan sales, still at 34% of the market in 2003, plus the highly successful AFC/Tellabs UMC family and now the Calix very advanced broadband family combined will never be surpassed by another area.

== Other changes ==
There have been numerous spin offs, acquisitions, startups and even IPOs that either directly or indirectly derived from DTS or Optilink in Telecom Valley's ever branching history. They have included: Telenetworks, Diamond Lane Communications, Advanced Fibre Communications, Next Level Communications, Fibex Systems, Fiberlane/Cerent, Mahi Networks, Calix, Turin Networks (now Dell), Dilithium Networks, Teknovus (now Broadcom), Cyan Optics along with many others. They collectively led to the coining of the term Telecom Valley due to the high density of telecom equipment suppliers in one small 10-mile corridor in Sonoma County. Nearly all the telecom startups in Telecom Valley were acquired by larger companies with life cycles similar to the original DTS->Farinon->Harris and Optilink->DSC->Alcatel acquisition legacies. In fairly recent times, even the successful Turin Networks has merged with Force10 Networks in 2009 while Mahi Networks was acquired by Meriton Networks in 2005. Only a few of the Telecom Valley startups remain independent by 2009. They include Cyan and Calix who has taken over the reign of the DLC in Telecom Valley after being started by DTS in 1969 and taken to dominance by Optilink/DSC/Alcatel-Lucent and then Advanced Fibre Communications/Tellabs in the early 1990s through the new millennium. The list of parents reads like a who's who in the telecom equipment supplier world and includes Cisco, Alcatel, Alcatel-Lucent, Nokia, Motorola, DSC, Tellabs, General Instrument, Force10, Meriton and others. The term has now fallen out of common use in Sonoma County after the market, and specifically high tech or dot-com bubble collapse of early 2000.

== Ranking ==
According to the market research firm RHK in 2003, Alcatel continued to hold the top ranking of 34% with Litespan-2000 sales after 20 years since Optilink's founding. Many other companies in the valley ended up folding

== Books ==
A book written by Don Green was released in October 2016. Defining Moments is a memoir of Mr. Green's life, beginning in England in the 1930s, then to Canada as a young man, and ultimately to California where he founded four successful telecommunication companies, coining him the "Father of Telecom Valley".

George Hawley published a memoir, “Tangled Wires” on Amazon in 2017 that includes some insight into the Optilink story.

== Transportation ==
- Route 101
