= Cerent Corporation =

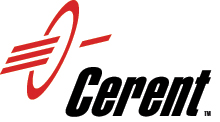
Cerent Corporation logo

Cerent Corporation was an optical equipment maker based in Petaluma, California. It was founded in 1997 as Fiberlane Communications with funding from Kleiner Perkins Caufield & Byers and Vinod Khosla as the managing VC. The company was founded with three divisions: Systems in Petaluma, Chip Design in Mountain View, California and Network Management Systems in Burnaby, British Columbia. In early 1998 the company split into two companies with the Petaluma branch becoming Cerent and the Burnaby and Mountain View branches becoming Siara Systems (Acquired by Redback Networks in 1999).

== The Cerent 454 ==
Cerent's first product was the Cerent 454 (later the Cisco 15454). The Cerent 454 was a second generation SONET ADM (Add-Drop Multiplexor) that also supported TCP/IP data switching. When operating as a pure ADM, the 454 could add and drop circuits from OC-192 down to Digital Signal 1 (DS1) -- later it would support wavelength-division multiplexing (WDM). Unlike the ADMs that preceded it, a transport signal did not have to be terminated outside the box to switch or route the TCP/IP packets. "Data cards" could be inserted into the chassis which would terminate the circuits then switch or route the packets between those terminated circuits. This capability meant carriers no longer had to purchase two boxes (e.g. an ADM and a router) just to move TCP/IP packets around its telecom network.

Other advantages of the Cerent 454 included: smaller form factor, higher port density, greater chip integration, and lower power consumption than competitors at the time. The unit also was one of the first network elements to utilize TCP/IP and a web server on its management interface (the first TCP/IP management network was Ditech Communications in its DWDM system, marketed in 1996) meaning it could be managed over a standard TCP/IP network as opposed to a more restrictive OSI network interface which was the standard in telecom networks at the time. This decision, while initially controversial, was promoted by Chip Roberson, for two pragmatic reasons: first, a TCP/IP stack came packaged with the embedded operating system from Wind River Systems and, second, the cost to acquire, test and support an OSI stack and associated network was comparatively cost-prohibitive for a young startup.

== Founding Team ==
The primary founders of the company were: Raj Singh, Jay Sethuram, Ajaib Bhadare and Paul Elliott. The rest of the founding team (as of funding by Kleiner Perkins Caufield & Byers) consisted of:

- Petaluma - Systems (Cerent)
  - Mike Hatfield
  - Tom Corker
  - Ajaib Bhadare
  - Paul Elliott
  - Chip Roberson
  - David Scott
- Mountain View - Chip Design (Siara)
  - Raj Singh
  - Jay Sethuram
  - Mike Iriarte
  - Anu Nigam
- Burnaby - Network Management System (Siara)
  - Alnoor Shivji
  - Sigfried Luft

The founding board of directors was: Raj Singh, Vinod Nair and Don Green (often referred to as "The Father of Telecom Valley").

Mike Hatfield soon after joined the team as CEO, replacing Raj Singh.

== Purchase by Cisco Systems ==
In August 1999, the company was sold to Cisco Systems for $7.2 billion and became the foundation of Cisco's Optical Transport Business Unit. The Cerent 454 was rebranded the Cisco 15454 and became the fastest product (at that time) to hit the $1B annual sales rate by selling $250 million in its second quarter as a Cisco business unit.

In November 1999, Redback bought Siara Systems for $4.3 billion.
