= G.992.3 Annex L =

ITU-T G.992.3 Annex L is an optional specification in the ITU-T recommendation G.992.3 for ADSL2 titled Specific requirements for a Reach Extended ADSL2 (READSL2) system operating in the frequency band above POTS, therefore it is often referred to as Reach Extended ADSL2 or READSL2.

The main difference between this specification and commonly deployed Annex A is the maximum distance that can be used. The power of the lower frequencies used for transmitting data is boosted up to increase the reach of this signal up to 7 kilometers (23,000 ft). The upper frequency limit for READSL2 is reduced to 552 kHz to keep the total power roughly the same as Annex A. Since READSL2 is intended for use on long loops there isn't much (any) usable bandwidth above 552 kHz anyway.

Although the standard development is completed and verified by the ITU, some owners of local loop networks don't allow this standard to be used because the high power can create audible Crosstalk. However, this standard is implemented nationwide by the incumbent local exchange carrier France Telecom.

== Frequency plans described in the various annexes ==
Frequency plan for common ADSL standards and annexes showing Annex A, B, I, J, L and M. POTS/ISDN Guard band Upstream Downstream ADSL/ADSL2 Downstream extended in ADSL2+

Tones are spaced apart by 4.3125kHz. In the Annex A, L and M frequency standards, POTS (analog PSTN voice) occupies (what would be) tones 0-3, tones 4-7 are reserved for a ‘guard band’, and the upstream DSL transmission band uses tones 8-31 in Annex A and L, or 8-56 in Annex M. In Annex B, ISDN occupies tones 0-31, DSL upstream uses tones 33-56. Annex I and J are for DSL-only lines with no POTS voice or ISDN and upstream uses tones 0-31 (Annex I) or 0-56 (Annex J). Downstream transmission uses the highest tones from tone 33 for Annex A, I, L, or 60 for Annex B, J and M upwards.

== See also ==
- Asymmetric digital subscriber line
- ADSL2
- ADSL2+
