= Uni-DSL =

Uni-DSL (UDSL) in telecommunications is a digital subscriber line (DSL) marketing buzzword developed by Texas Instruments which would provide bit rates of at least 200 Mbit/s in aggregate on the downstream and upstream paths. UDSL is backwards compatible with all discrete multitone modulation (DMT) standards (ADSL, ADSL2, ADSL2+, VDSL and VDSL2).

Uni-DSL means "One DSL for universal service". It was marketed to service providers as an affordable option to support all of their network requirements and services in fiber to the node configurations. It was announced in June 2004 with an expected "rolling-out" in 2006.
