= G.992.3 =

ITU-T Recommendation

- Asymmetric digital subscriber line transceivers 2 (ADSL2)
- Status: In force
- Year started: 2002
- Latest version: (10/12); October 2012
- Organization: ITU-T
- Related standards: G.992.5, G.992.3 Annex J
- Domain: telecommunications
- License: Freely available
- Website: https://www.itu.int/rec/T-REC-G.992.3/

ITU G.992.3 is an ITU (International Telecommunication Union) standard, also referred to as ADSL2 or G.dmt.bis. It optionally extends the capability of basic ADSL in data rates to 12 Mbit/s downstream and, depending on Annex version, up to 3.5 Mbit/s upstream (with a mandatory capability of ADSL2 transceivers of 8 Mbit/s downstream and 800 kbit/s upstream). ADSL2 uses the same bandwidth as ADSL but achieves higher throughput via improved modulation techniques. Actual speeds may decrease depending on line quality; usually the most significant factor in line quality is the distance from the DSLAM to the customer's equipment.

== Annex versions ==
ADSL2 has multiple modes for DSL providers to offer services for different needs. Below is a list of available features based on ADSL2 specs from the ITU standards.

Frequency plan for common ADSL standards and annexes POTS/ISDN Guard Band Upstream Downstream ADSL/ADSL2 Additional Downstream ADSL2+

Annex version	Spec	Description
A	xDSL over POTS	xDSL service functioning over plain old telephone service
B	xDSL over ISDN	xDSL Services running over Integrated Services Digital Network
C	xDSL in ISDN	xDSL System operating in the same cable as ISDN as defined in ITU-T Rec. G.961 Appendix III (Currently not implemented)
D	ATU-C and ATU-R state diagrams	See Annex D/G.992.3
E	POTS and ISDN-BA splitters	See Annex E/G.992.3. For operation according to Annexes A, B and I, the G.992.3 requirements applying over a frequency band up to 1104 kHz shall be met over a frequency band up to 2208 kHz.
F	ATU-x performance requirements for region A (North America)	F.1 Performance requirements for operation of ADSL over POTS (Annex A); F.2 Performance requirements for operation of All Digital Mode ADSL (Annex I); F.3 Performance requirements for operation of ADSL over POTS with extended upstream bandwidth (Annex L)
G	ATU-x performance requirements for region B (Europe)	G.1 Performance requirements for operation of ADSL over POTS (Annex A); G.2 Performance requirements for operation of ADSL over ISDN (Annex B); G.3 Performance requirements for operation of All Digital Mode ADSL (Annex I); G.4 Performance requirements for operation of All Digital Mode ADSL (Annex J); G.5 Performance requirements for operation of ADSL over POTS, with extended upstream bandwidth (Annex L)
I	All Digital mode ADSL with improved spectral compatibility with ADSL over POTS	Extending ADSL band to use the voice frequency range, 32 upstream tones for an additional 256 kbit/s upstream data rate over POTS lines.
J	All Digital mode ADSL with improved spectral compatibility with ADSL over ISDN	Extending ADSL band to use the voice frequency range, 64 upstream tones for an additional 256 kbit/s upstream data rate over ISDN Lines.
L	Reach Extended	Increases the range of the DSL service enabling the link to work at a distance of 7 kilometres (23,000 ft)
M	Increased Upload speeds	Upstream/downstream frequency split has been shifted from 138 kHz up to 276 kHz, allowing maximum upstream bandwidth to be increased from 1.4 Mbit/s to 3.3 Mbit/s.

== See also ==
- ADSL
- ADSL2+
- List of interface bit rates
- Wetting current
