= DHCP churn =

In computer networking, DHCP churn or IP churn is the rate at which hosts in a network change IP addresses using Dynamic Host Configuration Protocol (DHCP). IP churn is studied in the literature because it is a source of noise in internet measurement tasks, as it makes more difficult to estimate the unique number of users or devices connected to a network that visited a web page. Churn rates vary among different Internet service provider (ISP) networks, and especially in different countries.

== Bibliography ==
- G. C. M. Moura, C. Gañán, Q. Lone, P. Poursaied, H. Asghari and M. van Eeten, "How dynamic is the ISPs address space? Towards internet-wide DHCP churn estimation," 2015 IFIP Networking Conference (IFIP Networking), Toulouse, France, 2015, pp. 1-9, doi: 10.1109/IFIPNetworking.2015.7145335.
- Harm Griffioen and Christian Doerr. 2020. Quantifying autonomous system IP churn using attack traffic of botnets. In Proceedings of the 15th International Conference on Availability, Reliability and Security (ARES '20). Association for Computing Machinery, New York, NY, USA, Article 8, 1–10. https://doi.org/10.1145/3407023.3407051
