= Churning (cipher) =

Churning is an encryption function used to scramble downstream user data of the ATM passive optical network system defined by the ITU G.983.1 standard.

The standard states that churning "offers a low level of protection for data confidentiality". Cryptanalysis had shown that "the churning cipher is robustly weak".

== Algorithm ==
Churning uses 24 bits of the key, designated X1..X8 and P1..P16.

Ten static K bits are generated from the key:

K1 = (X1×P13×P14) + (X2×P13×not P14) + (X7×not P13×P14) + (X8×not P13×not P14)
K2 = (X3×P15×P16) + (X4×P15×not P16) + (X5×not P15×P16) + (X6×not P15×not P16)
K3 = (K1×P9) + (K2×not P9)
K4 = (K1×not P9) + (K2×P9)
K5 = (K1×P10) + (K2×not P10)
K6 = (K1×not P10) + (K2×P10)
K7 = (K1×P11) + (K2×not P11)
K8 = (K1×not P11) + (K2×P11)
K9 = (K1×P12) + (K2×not P12)
K10 = (K1×not P12) + (K2×P12)

The churning transforms eight Y bits into eight Z bits:

(Z1..Z4) = TransformNibble(Y1..Y4, K1, P1, K3, K2, P2, K4, K1, K3, K5, K2, P4, K6)
(Z5..Z8) = TransformNibble(Y5..Y8, K1, P5, K7, K2, P6, K8, K1, P7, K9, K2, P8, K10)

== Cryptanalysis ==
The cryptanalysis had shown the cipher to be effectively broken in more than one way:

- the cipher pretends to be using a 24-bit key, but the effective key length is 8 bit, making a full search attack trivial
- being a substitution cipher, churning is easily attacked using the standard attacks against this class of ciphers
- the churning function is entirely linear, so it can be broken using linear algebra.

== Triple churning ==
Due to extreme weakness of the churning cipher, PON systems frequently use the "triple churning" technique, where the three churning operations are combined with two XORs with adjacent data in the stream.

== Patents ==
PMC Sierra holds patents on triple churning (U.S. patent 7,646,870).

== Sources ==
- ITU-T Recommendation G.983.1. Broadband optical access systems based on Passive Optical Networks (PON). 13 October 1998.
