= STM-4 =

The STM-4 (Synchronous Transport Module level-4) is a transmission rate defined within the Synchronous Digital Hierarchy (SDH), a set of optical network standards specified by the International Telecommunication Union Telecommunication Standardization Sector (ITU-T). The SDH frame structure and line rates, including STM-4, are defined in ITU-T Recommendation G.707.

STM-4 operates at a line rate of 622.080 Mbit/s, corresponding to four multiplexed STM-1 signals. SDH frames are transmitted every 125 microseconds, reflecting the 8 kHz sampling rate historically used in digital telephony systems. Within this frame structure, the payload area can transport multiplexed tributary signals or virtual containers carrying services such as digital voice or data. Optical links for these transmission systems are specified in ITU-T Recommendation G.957, while functional equipment characteristics are described in ITU-T Recommendation G.783.

STM-4 is broadly comparable to OC-12 in the Synchronous Optical Networking (SONET) standard used primarily in North America. The two systems are designed to be interoperable, with equivalent line rates and compatible frame structures, though the standards differ slightly in terminology and overhead organization.

== SDH Rates ==
SDH is a transport hierarchy based on multiples of 155.52 Mbit/s. The basic unit of SDH is STM-1, each rate is an exact multiple of the lower rate, therefore the hierarchy is synchronous.

STM-1	155.520 Mbit/s
STM-4	622.080 Mbit/s
STM-16	2,488.320 Mbit/s (~2.5 Gbit/s)
STM-64	9,953.280 Mbit/s (~10 Gbit/s)
STM-256	39,813.120 Mbit/s (~40 Gbit/s)

Beyond this we have wavelength-division multiplexing (WDM) commonly used in submarine cabling.

== STM-1 frame structure ==
The basic STM-1 carrier frame consists of eight overheads, four pointers and a space for the payload. The overheads are the regeneration section overhead (RSOH), associated with the regenerators, and the multiplex section overhead (MSOH), associated with the multiplexers.

The space for the payload carries the VC-4 container, the first byte of which is signaled by the AU-4 pointer, and which is allowed to move in order to accommodate frequency

In previous sections we have looked at an example in which a 140 Mbit/s signal was mapped into a VC-4, but the multiplexing map lets the STM-1 signal transport other types of Plesiochronous signals and even combinations of signals. All the possibilities are shown in the table below:

Composition	2 Mbit/s	34 Mbit/s	140 Mbit/s
1x VC-4	0	0	1
3x VC-3	0	3	0
42xVC-12 + 1xVC-3	42	1	0
63xVC-12	63	0	0

The basic STM-1 transport rate is 155.520 Mbit/s and is defined in the ITU-T recommendation G.707.

As mentioned above, the overhead of an STM-4 signal (SOH) is divided into two parts: the MSOH and the RSOH. The overheads contain information from the system itself, which is used for a wide range of management functions, such as monitoring transmission quality, detecting failures, managing alarms, data communication channels, service channels, etc. These functions will be described in more detail in the section on network management services.

An STM-4 frame consists of 36 rows each containing 270 bytes. This is a direct multiple of STM-1, which consists of 9 rows each containing 270 bytes. The frame frequency of 32 kHz has also been chosen as a 4x multiple of that of STM-1, so that one byte of frame corresponds to the transmission capacity of a 64 kbit/s channel.

The first 36 bytes of each row of a frame (with the exception of row 16) contain a Section OverHead. The first 36 bytes of row 16 contain the AU pointer (payload address). The field consisting of 261X36 bytes is for payload transmission (The STM payload is known as the Virtual Container (VC) and consists of the actual payload, known as the Container (C) and additional overhead known as Path Over Head (POH), for path related information).

The Virtual Container is not located rigidly in the frame but can move around freely in the payload section. The pointer indicates the position of the first byte of the VC (which is always the first byte of the POH). This allows a VC received in the multiplexer to be matched to a pre-specified frame phase of the STM-4.
