= STM-1 =

Fiber optic network transmission standard

The STM-1 (Synchronous Transport Module level-1) is the SDH ITU-T fiber optic network transmission standard. It has a bit rate of 155.52 Mbit/s. Higher levels go up by a factor of 4 at a time: the other currently supported levels are STM-4, STM-16, STM-64 and STM-256. Above STM-256 wavelength-division multiplexing (WDM) is commonly used in submarine cabling.

== Frame structure ==
The STM-1 frame is on the basic transmission format for SDH (Synchronous Digital Hierarchy). An STM-1 frame has a byte-oriented structure with 9 rows and 270 columns of bytes, for a total of 2,430 bytes (9 rows * 270 columns = 2430 bytes). Each byte corresponds to a 64 kbit/s channel.

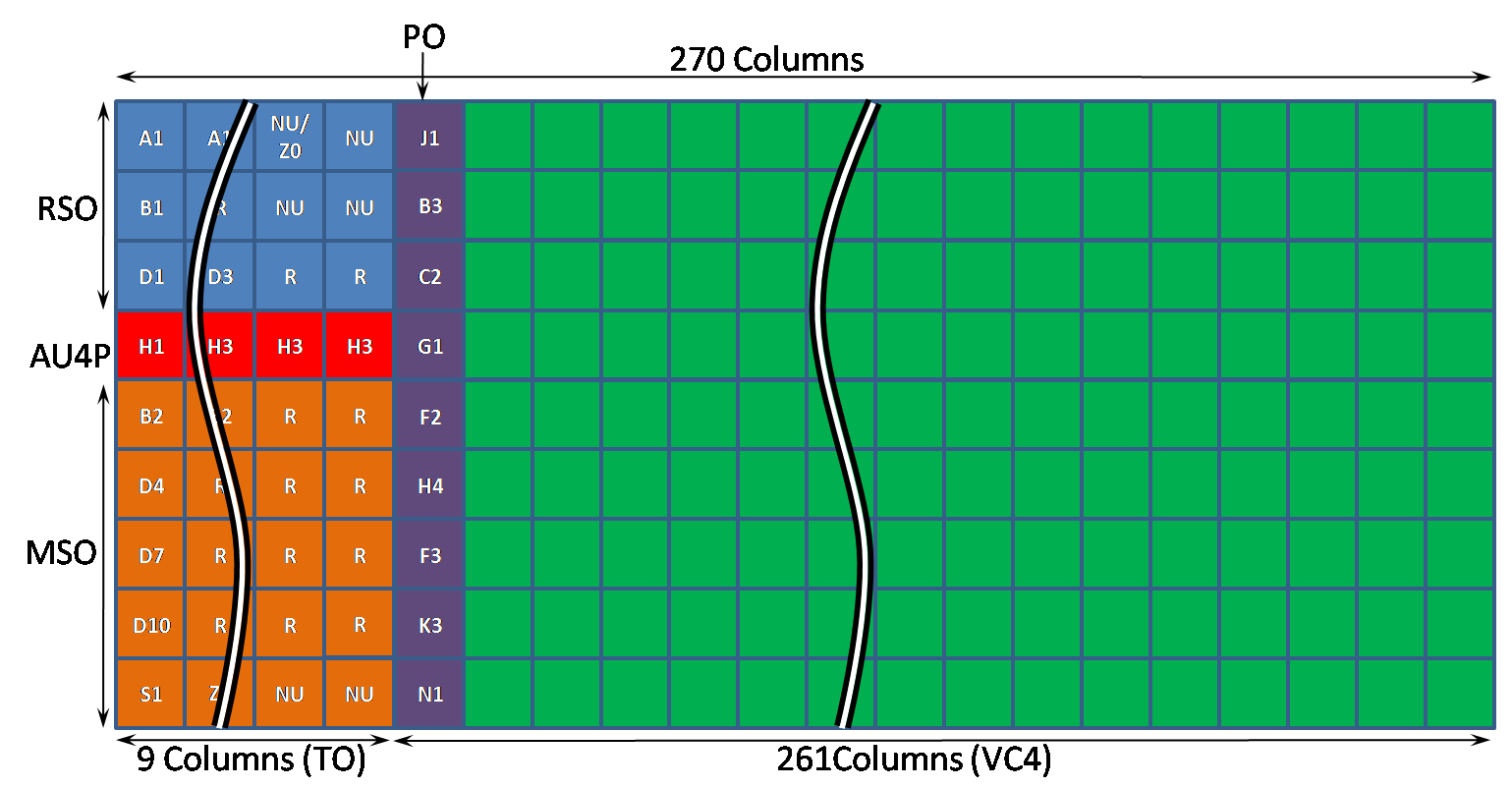

TOH: Transport Overhead (RSOH + AU4P + MSOH)

- MSOH: Multiplex Section Overhead
- RSOH: Regeneration Section Overhead
- AU4P: AU-4 Pointers

VC4: Virtual Container-4 payload (POH + VC-4 Data)

- POH: Path Overhead

== Frame characteristic ==
The STM-1 base frame is structured with the following characteristics:

- Length: 270 column × 9 row = 2430 bytes
- Byte: 1-byte = 8 bit
- Duration (Frame repetition time): 125 μs i.e. 8000 frame/s
- Rate (Frame capacity): 2430 × 8 × 8000 = 155.52 Mbit/s
- Payload = 2349 bytes × 8 bits × 8000 frames/sec = 150.336 Mbit/s

== RSOH (regenerator section overhead) ==
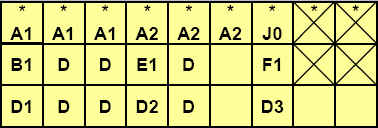

- 1st row = Unscrambled bytes. Their contents should therefore be monitored
- X = Bytes reserved for national use
- D = Bytes depending on the medium (satellite, radio relay system, ...)

The Regenerator Section OverHead uses the first three rows & nine columns in the STM-1 frame

- A1, A2 The Frame Alignment Word is used to recognize the beginning of an STM-N frame
- A1: 1111 0110 = F6 (HEX)
- A2: 0010 1000 = 28 (HEX)
- J0: Path Trace. It is used to give a path through an SDH Network a "Name". This message (Name) enables the receiver to check the continuity of its connection with the desired transmitter
- B1: Bit Error Monitoring. The B1 Byte contains the result of the parity check of the previous STM frame, after scrambling of the actual STM frame. This check is carried out with a Bit Interleaved Parity check (BIP-8).
- E1 Engineering Orderwire (EOW). It can be used to transmit speech signals between Regenerator Sections for operating and maintenance purposes
- F1 User Channel. It is used to transmit data and speech for service and maintenance
- D1 to D3 Data Communication Channel at 192 kbit/s (DCCR). This channel is used to transmit management information via the STM-N frames

== MSOH (multiplex section overhead) ==
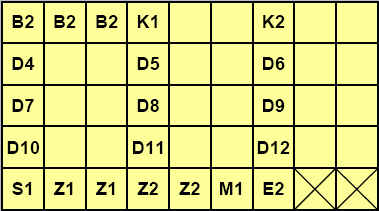

X = Bytes reserved for national use.

The Multiplex Section OverHead uses the 5th through 9th rows, and first 9 columns in the STM-1 frame.

- B2 : Bit Error Monitoring. The B2 Bytes contains the result of the parity check of the previous STM frame, except the RSOH, before scrambling of the actual STM frame. This check is carried out with a Bit Interleaved Parity check (BIP24)
- K1, K2 Automatic Protection Switching (APS). In case of a failure, the STM frames can be routed new with the help of the K1, K2 Bytes through the SDH Network. Assigned to the multiplexing section protection (MSP) protocol
- K2 (Bit6,7,8) MS_RDI: Multiplex Section Remote Defect Indication (former MS_FERF: Multiplex Section Far End Receive Failure)
- D4 to D12 Data Communication Channel at 576 kbit/s (DCCM). (See also D1-D3 in RSOH above)
- S1 (Bit 5 - 8) Synchronisation quality level:
  - 0000 Quality unknown
  - 0010 G.811 10-11/day frequency drift
  - 0100 G.812T transit 10-9 /day frequency drift
  - 1000 G.812L local 2*10-8/day frequency drift
  - 1011 G.813 5*10-7/day frequency drift
  - 1111 Not to be used for synchronisation
- E2 Engineering Order wire (EOW). Same function as E1 in RSOH
- M1 MS_REI: Multiplex Section Remote Error Indicator, number of interleaved bits which have been detected to be erroneous in the received B2 bytes. (former MS_FEBE: Multiplexing Section Far End Block Errored)
- Z1, Z2 Spare bytes
