= Higher Speed PON =

ITU-T recommendation

- Higher Speed Passive Optical Networks
- Abbreviation: G.9804
- Status: In force
- Year started: 2018
- Latest version: 1.0; November 2019
- Organization: ITU-T
- Base standards: 10G-PON, NG-PON2
- Domain: Telecommunication
- License: Freely available
- Website: https://www.itu.int/rec/T-REC-G.9804.1

Higher Speed PON (HSP), also known as G.9804, is a family of ITU-T recommendations (computer networking standards) for data links, capable of delivering shared Internet access rates up to 50 Gbit/s (gigabits per second, Gbps). Higher Speed PON is the first PON system to use digital signal processing, succeeding both single-channel XGS-PON and multi-channel NG-PON2. It provides upgrade paths for legacy PON generations such as GPON, XG-PON, XGS-PON, and 10G-EPON.

== Development ==
Following the publication of 40 Gbps NG-PON2 in July 2015, standardization activities turned to higher speed PON. In November 2016, the Full Service Access Network (FSAN) Group released the Standards Roadmap 2.0 which indicated the development of "future optical access systems" with peak transmission rates above 10 Gbps.

Concurrently, ITU-T Study Group 15 launched the G.sup.HSP project to study higher speed PON technologies, culminating in the publication of ITU-T G.sup.64 (G.sup.HSP) in February 2018. Among possible nominal line rates of 20, 25, 50, and 100 Gbps per wavelength, the January 2018 Study Group 15 Plenary Meeting selected 50 Gbps as the next generation after 10 Gbps to provide a sufficiently large increment to network capacity while remaining technically feasible for network operators.

The G.9804 standard series was established and intended to consist of four main recommendations. Recommendations G.9804.1 and G.9804.2 apply to all HSP systems, whereas G.9804.3 concerns physical medium dependent layer specifications for 50 Gbps PON (50G-PON) systems only. Another recommendation, G.hsp.TWDMPMD, is under study in conjunction with IEEE working group P802.3.

== Standards ==
=== G.9804.1 ===
G.9804.1 (G.hsp.req): Higher speed passive optical networks - Requirements serves as a guide for the development of higher speed PON systems by providing examples of "services, user network interfaces, and service node interfaces" required for higher speed networks, such as higher speed single channel (TDMA-PON), higher speed multichannel (TWDM-PON), and higher speed point-to-point overlay PONs. It provides requirements for backwards compatibility with the G.9807.x series covering GPON, XG(S)-PON, and 10G-EPON systems. The standard achieved consent in July 2019, was approved in November 2019, and was amended in August 2021.

=== G.9804.2 ===
G.9804.2 (G.hsp.comTC): Higher speed passive optical networks - Common transmission convergence layer specification defines the frame format and media access control method for exchange between optical line terminals (OLTs) and optical network units (ONUs) in higher speed networks. It is intended to support a variety of physical medium dependent (PMD) sublayers in all high speed PON systems and be future-proof. It was approved in September 2021.

=== G.9804.3 ===
G.9804.3 (G.hsp.50Gpmd): 50-Gigabit-capable passive optical networks (50G-PON) - Physical media dependent (PMD) layer specification sets standards for the PMD sublayer of a 50 Gbps single-channel PON system (50G-PON) for residential, business, and mobile backhaul applications. It was approved in September 2021.

== Technical requirements ==
General technical requirements
Nominal line rate combination
Symmetric per channel	50 Gbps both downstream and upstream (Note: The upstream nominal line rate of 50 Gbps is left for further study.)	
Asymmetric	50 Gbps down, 25 Gbps up	
Asymmetric	50 Gbps down, 12.5 Gbps up	
Wavelength bands
Downstream	1340~1344 nm	
Upstream	Wideband: 1260~1280 nm (GPON compatible)	
Upstream	Wideband: 1290~1310 nm (XG(S)-PON compatible); Narrowband: 1298~1302 nm	
Maximum fiber distance
General application	20 km	
Latency-sensitive (e.g. 5G)	10 km	
Power budget classes
Coexistence strategy	Class	Range (dB)
Multi-PON module (MPM)	N1	14–29
Multi-PON module (MPM)	C+	17–32
Non-MPM (Note: Use cases using external coexistence elements (CEx) or direct optical distribution network (ODN) connection.)	N1	14–29
Non-MPM	N2	16–31
Non-MPM	E1	18–33
Non-MPM	E2	20–35

== Field trials ==
- In September 2021, researchers from Huawei and China Telecom reported network carrier lab results of a 50G-PON prototype, achieving ~40 Gbps downstream speed, ~16 Gbps upstream speed, and ~80 μs of latency on a 10 km fiber link.
- In October 2021, Swisscom announced the successful implementation of 50 Gbps down- and 25 Gbps upstream transmission speeds on a fixed network connection in a real network environment by upgrading the OLT line card to a 50G-PON prototype.

== Internet service providers ==
- United States - Google Fiber, Frontier
- United Kingdom - Netomnia, Ogi
- Hong Kong - HKBN
- Chile - Mundo
