= G.992.5 =

Technology for broadband Internet access

- Asymmetric digital subscriber line 2 transceivers (ADSL2)- Extended bandwidth ADSL2 (ADSL2plus)
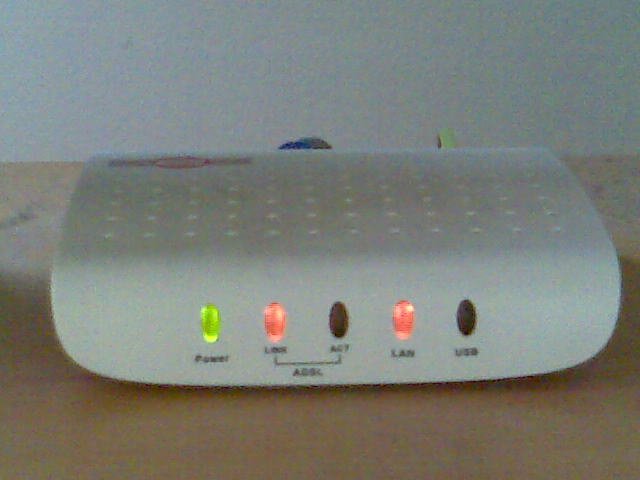
- Status: In force
- Year started: 2003
- Latest version: 3.1; November 2010
- Organization: ITU-T
- Related standards: G.992.3, G.992.5 Annex M
- Domain: telecommunications
- License: Freely available
- Website: www.itu.int/rec/T-REC-G.992.5

G.992.5 (also referred to as ADSL2+, G.dmt.bis+, and G.adslplus) is an ITU-T standard for asymmetric digital subscriber line (ADSL) broadband Internet access. The standard has a maximum theoretical downstream sync speed of 24 megabits per second (Mbit/s). Utilizing G.992.5 Annex M upstream sync speeds of 3.3 Mbit/s can be achieved.

== Technical information ==
ADSL2+ extends the capability of basic ADSL by doubling the number of downstream channels. The data rates can be as high as 24 Mbit/s downstream and up to 1.4 Mbit/s upstream depending on the distance from the DSLAM to the customer's premises.

ADSL2+ is capable of doubling the frequency band of typical ADSL connections from 1.1 MHz to 2.2 MHz. This doubles the downstream data rates of the previous ADSL2 standard (which was up to 12 Mbit/s), and like the previous standards will degrade from its peak bitrate after a certain distance.

ADSL2+ also allows port bonding. This is where multiple ports are physically provisioned to the end user and the total bandwidth is equal to the sum of all provisioned ports. So if 2 lines capable of 24 Mbit/s were bonded the result would be a connection capable of 48 Mbit/s download and twice the original upload speed. Not all DSLAM vendors have implemented this functionality. ADSL2+ port bonding is also known as G.998.x or G.Bond.

ITU-T Spec	Description
G.998.1	ATM-based multi-pair bonding: A method for bonding of multiple DSL lines to transport an ATM payload beyond the rate/reach capability of a single DSL loop. This protocol allows the bonding of 2 to 32 pairs and supports dynamic removal and restoration of pairs without human intervention.
G.998.2	Ethernet-based multi-pair bonding: Provides a method for bonding of multiple DSL lines for Ethernet transport. This recommendation builds on the IEEE 802.3ah-2004 methods and extends Ethernet transport over other xDSL technologies, including ADSL.
G.998.3	Multi-pair bonding using time-division inverse multiplexing: Details a method for bonding DSL lines using time-division inverse multiplexing (TDIM). This recommendation uses IEEE 802.3ah handshake for pair discovery, parameter negotiation, and setup. It also allows the hitless addition and removal of pairs and the fast removal of a pair upon pair failure.

== See also ==
- ADSL
- List of interface bit rates
- VDSL#VDSL2
