= Rate-Adaptive Digital Subscriber Line =

Digital subscriber line technology

Rate-adaptive digital subscriber line (RADSL) is a pre-standard asymmetric digital subscriber line (ADSL) solution. RADSL was introduced as proprietary technology by AT&T Paradyne, later GlobeSpan Technologies Inc., in June 1996. In September 1999, RADSL technology was formally described by ANSI in T1.TR.59-1999. RADSL supports downstream data rates of up to approximately 8 Mbit/s, upstream data rates up to approximately 1 Mbit/s, and can coexist with POTS voice on the same line.

RADSL allows rate-adaptation while the connection is in operation — rate-adaptation during connection setup is possible in many other DSL variants, including G.dmt and its successors. Rate-adaptation while the connection is in operation is specified as an option in ADSL2, ADSL2+, and VDSL2, under the name seamless rate adaptation (SRA).

== Technology ==
RADSL specifies two alternative modulation schemes, quadrature amplitude modulation (QAM) and carrierless amplitude phase modulation (CAP). RADSL is not interoperable with discrete multi-tone (DMT) modulation variants of ADSL, standardized in ANSI T1.413 Issue 2 and G.dmt (G.992.1). Upstream and downstream are frequency-division duplexed, the upstream and downstream transmit PSD masks are identical to those in ANSI T1.413.

In RADSL, the baud rate, center frequency, and constellation size of the downstream and upstream channels can be adjusted while the connection is in operation. Using this technique the line is more tolerant of errors caused by noise and signal loss. As the parameters are adjusted, the bandwidth may be markedly decreased if there is a large amount of line noise or signal degradation.

== See also ==
- Etherloop—another DSL variant using single-carrier modulation (QAM)
- High-bit-rate digital subscriber line (HDSL)—another DSL variant using single-carrier modulation (CAP)
- Multi-rate symmetric digital subscriber line (MSDSL)—another DSL variant using single-carrier modulation (CAP)
- Very-high-bit-rate digital subscriber line (VDSL)—another DSL variant using single-carrier modulation (QAM)
