= Nokia M1122 =

ADSL router model

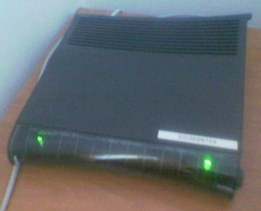

The Nokia M1122 is a 4-port ADSL router that is known to have been sold in Europe and New Zealand in 2000–2002. In addition to its main task, it can operate as a 10 Mbit/s Ethernet hub in a local area network.

The M1122 had a sister model, Nokia MW1122, with Wireless LAN capabilities. They were the last ADSL routers manufactured by Nokia. In the last half of 2002 the model was discontinued along with the rest of Nokia's ADSL router operations.

== Technical specifications ==
- ANSI T1.413 Issue 2 (chipset by Alcatel)
- can be used either in routed or bridged mode
- connectors: ADSL line cord to the phone plug, power cord, CLI port, power switch and four 10BASE-T ports
- LEDs: power, status, ADSL line and 4*Ethernet
- dimensions: width 22.5 cm, height 6.5 cm, depth 23 cm, weight 1 kg
- Internal power supply: 100 - 240 V

== Administration interface ==
There are two ways to do maintenance work in M1122. The preferred way to do that is via a Web interface. Users can, however, also choose to enter commands in a text-based console that can be reached both through telnet and with a special CLI cable whose other end is attached to the computer's COM port. The router has a limitation, that when bridged mode is turned on, the CLI cable is the only way to maintain it.

The CLI connector is an 8P8C (RJ-45) female modular connector with a pinout similar to EIA/TIA - 561 but crosslinked, swapping the DTE and DCE roles.
