= SkyDSL =

European satellite internet provider

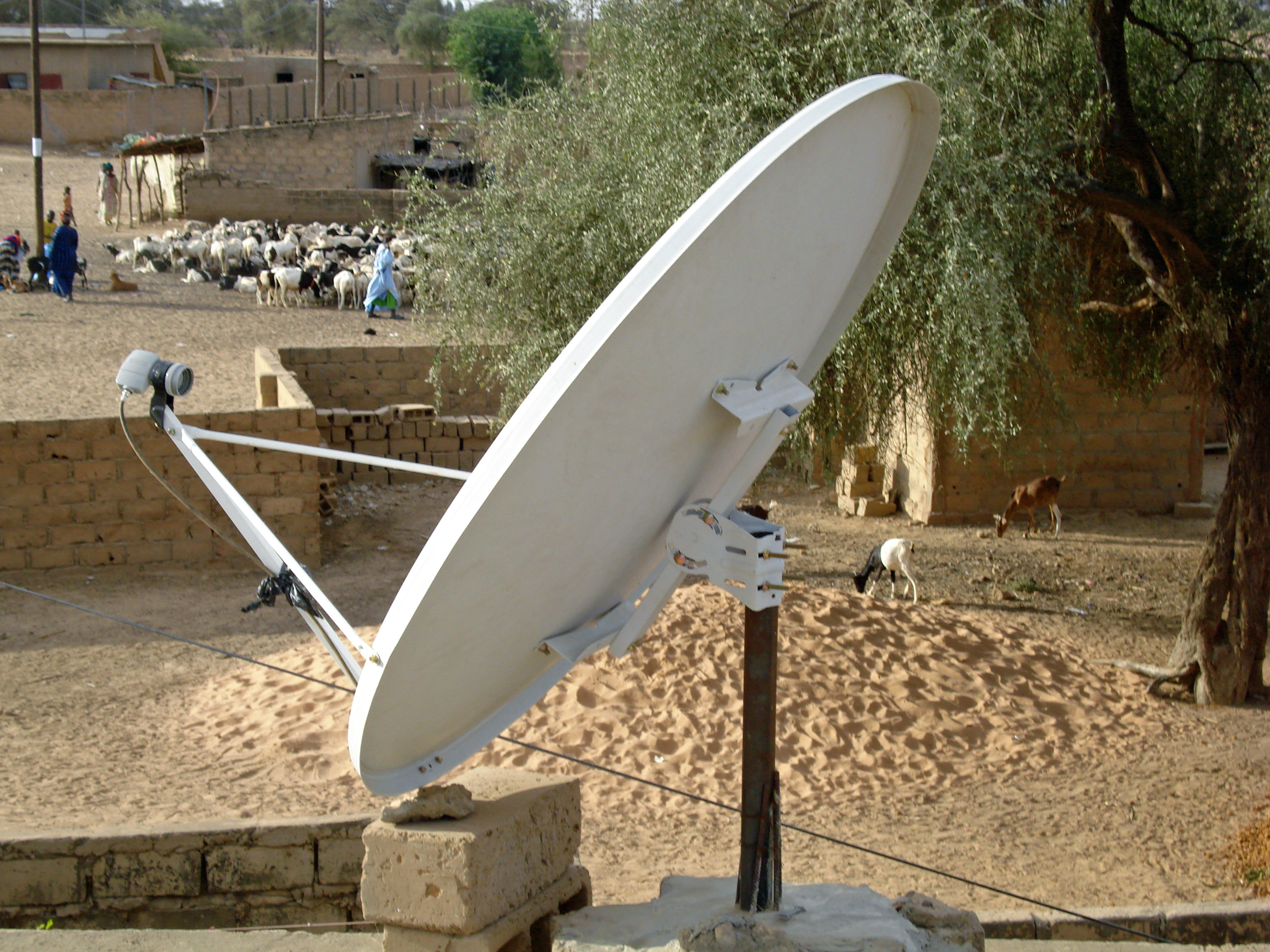
Example of a SkyDSL Transmitter/Receiver

skyDSL is a Europe-wide service offered by skyDSL Global GmbH that offers internet access via satellite. skyDSL is available throughout Europe and reaches all regions not covered by regular DSL.

skyDSL operates its service by running the downstream and upstream connection transmitting to and receiving from satellites. SkyDSL 2 offers a 100% satellite solution for those lacking phone lines, a common problem in many communities.

A major speed factor in this type of internet connection is statistical contention between users for access to the satellite channel. Satellite bandwidth is shared by all users. During a download, the transmission rate can be expected to fluctuate as other users sign on and off and vary their rates of download.

== History ==
SkyDSL first became available in the UK in 2005.
