= Carrierless amplitude phase modulation =

Type of amplitude modulation lacking a carrier

Carrierless amplitude phase modulation (CAP) is a variant of quadrature amplitude modulation (QAM). Instead of modulating the amplitude of two carrier waves, CAP generates a QAM signal by combining two PAM signals filtered through two filters designed so that their impulse responses form a Hilbert pair. If the impulse responses of the two filters are chosen as sine and a cosine, the only mathematical difference between QAM and CAP waveforms is that the phase of the carrier is reset at the beginning of each symbol. If the carrier frequency and symbol rates are similar, the main advantage of CAP over QAM is simpler implementation. The modulation of the baseband signal with the quadrature carriers is not necessary with CAP, because it is part of the transmit pulse.

== Applications ==
CAP finds application in HDSL and in early proprietary ADSL variants. For HDSL, the American ANSI standard specifies 2B1Q rather than CAP, while the European ETSI ETR 152 and the international ITU-T G.991.2 standards specify both CAP and 2B1Q. For ADSL deployments CAP was the de facto standard up until 1996, deployed in 90 percent of ADSL installs. The standardized variants of ADSL, ANSI T1.413 Issue 2 and G.dmt, as well as the successors ADSL2, ADSL2+, VDSL2, and G.fast, do not specify CAP, but rather discrete multi-tone (DMT) modulation.

CAP used for ADSL divides the available frequency spectrum into three bands. The range from 0 to 4 kHz is allocated for POTS transmissions. The range of 25 kHz to 160 kHz is allocated for upstream data traffic and the range of 240 kHz to 1.5 MHz is allocated for downstream data traffic, in a frequency-division duplexing (FDD) scheme.
