= G.992.2 =

- Splitterless asymmetric digital subscriber line (ADSL) transceivers
- Status: In force
- Year started: 1999
- Latest version: (10/03); October 2003
- Organization: ITU-T
- Committee: ITU-T Study Group 15
- Related standards: G.992.1, G.992.3
- Domain: telecommunication
- License: Freely available
- Website: https://www.itu.int/rec/T-REC-G.992.2

In telecommunications, ITU G.992.2 (better known as G.lite) is an ITU standard for ADSL using discrete multitone modulation. G.lite is designed to not require the use of a DSL filter.

G.lite is a modulation profile which can be selected on a DSLAM port by an ADSL provider and provides greater resistance to noise and tolerates longer loop lengths (DSLAM to customer distances) for a given bandwidth. Most ADSL modems and DSLAM ports support it, but it is not a typical default configuration. The transmission speed of G.lite (G.992.2) is 1.5 Mbit/s downstream and 512 kbit/s upstream.

The G.lite specification was an accelerated ITU-T effort to drive interoperability among vendors and was facilitated by the Universal ADSL Working Group, or UAWG. The G.lite standardization effort took a total of 11 months from start to finish, setting a new record for ANY standard effort within the ITU-T. The previous record had been the V.90 specification for analog modems, which took 18 months to complete. The UAWG consisted of three sets of members: Promoters, Supporters and Adopters. Intel, Compaq and Microsoft were able to rally the support of all of the US RBOCs and five of the largest international carriers (NTT, British Telecom, France Telecom, Deutsche Telekom, and Singapore Telecom), collectively representing the Promoters, to drive the major communications equipment manufacturers (the Supporters) to demonstrate interoperability of products based on the G.lite specification at SUPERCOMM in June 1999. Adopters represented the majority of the remaining companies in the communications industry that were committed to supporting the new technology specification.

== See also ==
- List of interface bit rates
