= Microfilter =

Microfilter may refer to:

- DSL filter, used to prevent interference between analog devices and a DSL service on a telephone line
- A type of filter used in the microfiltration process
