= Noise margin =

In electrical engineering, noise margin is the maximum voltage amplitude of extraneous signal that can be algebraically added to the noise-free worst-case input level without causing the output voltage to deviate from the allowable logic voltage level. It is commonly used in at least two contexts as follows:

- In telecommunications engineering, noise margin is the ratio by which the signal exceeds the minimum acceptable amount. It is normally measured in decibels.
- In a digital circuit, the noise margin is the amount by which the signal exceeds the threshold for a proper '0' (logic low) or '1' (logic high). For example, a digital circuit might be designed to swing between 0.0 and 1.2 volts, with anything below 0.2 volts considered a '0', and anything above 1.0 volts considered a '1'. Then the noise margin for a '0' would be the amount that a signal is below 0.2 volts, and the noise margin for a '1' would be the amount by which a signal exceeds 1.0 volt. In this case noise margins are measured as an absolute voltage, not a ratio. Noise margins for CMOS chips are usually much greater than those for TTL because the V_{OH min} is closer to the power supply voltage and V_{OL max} is closer to zero.
  - Real digital inverters do not instantaneously switch from a logic high (1) to a logic low (0), there is some capacitance. While an inverter is transitioning from a logic high to low, there is an undefined region where the voltage cannot be considered high or low. This is considered a noise margin. There are two noise margins to consider: Noise margin high (N_{MH}) and noise margin low (N_{ML}). N_{MH} is the amount of voltage between an inverter transitioning from a logic high (1) to a logic low (0) and vice versa for N_{ML}. The equations are as follows: N_{MH} ≡ V_{OH} - V_{IH} and N_{ML} ≡ V_{IL} - V_{OL}. Typically, in a CMOS inverter V_{OH} will equal V_{DD} and V_{OL} will equal the ground potential, as mentioned above.
    - V_{IH} is defined as the highest input voltage at which the slope of the voltage transfer characteristic (VTC) is equal to -1, where the VTC is the plot of all valid output voltages vs. input voltages. Similarly, V_{IL} is defined as the lowest input voltage where slope of the VTC is equal to -1.

In practice, noise margins are the amount of noise, that a logic circuit can withstand. Noise margins are generally defined so that positive values ensure proper operation, and negative margins result in compromised operation, or outright failure.

== See also ==
- Circuit
- Signal integrity
- Substrate coupling
- G.992.1
- Signal-to-noise ratio
- Signal
