= G.992.4 =

ITU G.992.4 is a standard for splitterless ADSL2 with data rate mandatory capability reduced to 1.536 Mbit/s downstream and 512 kbit/s upstream. It is also referred to as G.lite.bis.

== See also ==
- ADSL
- ADSL2+
- List of interface bit rates
