= Multi-rate symmetric digital subscriber line =

Multi-rate symmetric DSL (MSDSL or MDSL) is a proprietary, non-standardized symmetric digital subscriber line technology with a maximum distance of 29,000 feet (8,800 m). It is capable of multiple transfer rates, as set by the Internet service provider, typically based on the service and/or price. Eight data rates are available, ranging from 160 kbit/s to 2.32 Mbit/s.

== Technology ==
MSDSL uses either 2B1Q or carrierless amplitude phase modulation (CAP) transmission with a capacity of up to 2.32 Mbit/s. The bandwidth is generally split between a full E-carrier E1 payload (2.048 Mbit/s), with the remaining bandwidth accommodating up to three voice channels or two ISDN channels. Additional bandwidth is used for management purposes. Transmission over the single pair requires echo cancellation and adaptive equalizers in order to achieve the maximum range at a specific rate. For each user rate, the modem changes the 2B1Q or CAP transmission rate, employing different filters and equalizer settings. The modem's adaptive setting is determined during its initial use, and continues constantly during operation.
