= FS-VDSL =

The Full Service-VDSL Committee (FS-VDSL) was founded in July 2000 with the aim of rapidly specifying a low cost, high capability end-to-end multi-service network based on VDSL Frequency Band Plan 998 which can be quickly and economically deployed to enable customers, focusing principally on consumer market, to benefit from competition. It was a non-profit international organization based in Switzerland. FS-VDSL was closed, according to its statutes, after 3 years of activity. Its specifications, downstreamed to ITU-T Study Group 16 became international standards as Recommendations H.610 and H.611.

At closing time, FS-VDSL was composed of 106 members, including Telcos, Telecommunication manufacturers, chip manufacturers, service providers.

== Specifications ==
The FS-VDSL Specifications are composed of 5 parts :

1. Operator Requirements Specification (Defining services requirements and infrastructure deployment issues. Protecting digital content is also addressed.)
2. Architecture (SA) Specification (Defining end-to-end platform architecture and protocols)
3. Customer Premises Equipment Specification - CPE - (Defining customer equipment configurations and connectivity functions.)
4. Physical Layer Specification for Interoperable VDSL Systems (Promoting VDSL transceiver interoperability)
5. Operations, Administration, Maintenance & Provisioning Specification (Defining the operational aspects for economic deployment of VDSL platforms)

== FS-VDSL and ITU-T ==
The Full Service VDSL Specifications were published on June 5, 2002. This means that anybody can access them from this web site, that any vendor can implement them, provided they comply with IPR rules, and that any operator can use them to provide services on their network.

This forum has therefore achieved the first objective foreseen when the FS-VDSL Committee was set up in 2000. The normal result should have been to wind up the forum on expiry of its work. However, the FS-VDSL specifications are only private documents, with no legal basis and despite their technical value, they cannot be referenced in official procurements in the same way as recognised standards - only official recognised standards have such status.

The Telecommunication Standardisation Sector of the International Telecommunication Union (ITU-T), a multi-governmental entity which is part of the United Nations, has now facilitated this forum to join their efforts to promote global standards. The FS-VDSL Management Committee has agreed to form a specialised group tasked with publishing ITU-T specifications or Recommendations based on the work done so far.

This group has been accepted by the ITU-T management as the FS-VDSL Focus Group. The creation of the Focus Group was formally approved by Study Group 16 at its meeting in October 2002. The parts 2 and 3 of the specifications was reformated by the Focus Group as Recommendation H.610 and part 5 as Recommendation H.611
