= VDSL =

Digital subscriber line technology

- Very high speed digital subscriber line transceivers
- Status: In force
- Year started: 2001
- Latest version: (11/15); November 2015
- Organization: ITU-T
- Committee: ITU-T Study Group 15
- Related standards: G.993.1, G.993.2
- Domain: telecommunications
- License: Freely available
- Website: www.itu.int/rec/T-REC-G.993.2

Very high-speed digital subscriber line (VDSL) and very high-speed digital subscriber line 2 (VDSL2) are digital subscriber line (DSL) technologies providing data transmission faster than the earlier standards of asymmetric digital subscriber line (ADSL) G.992.1, G.992.3 (ADSL2) and G.992.5 (ADSL2+).

VDSL offers speeds of up to 52 Mbit/s downstream and 16 Mbit/s upstream, over a single twisted pair of copper wires using the frequency band from 25 kHz to 12 MHz. These rates mean that VDSL is capable of supporting applications such as high-definition television, as well as telephone services (voice over IP) and general Internet access, over a single connection. VDSL is deployed over existing wiring used for analog telephone service and lower-speed DSL connections. This standard was approved by the International Telecommunication Union (ITU) in November 2001.

Second-generation systems (VDSL2; ITU-T G.993.2 approved in February 2006) use frequencies of up to 30 MHz to provide data rates exceeding 100 Mbit/s simultaneously in both the upstream and downstream directions. The maximum available bit rate is achieved at a range of about 300 metres (980 ft); performance degrades as the local loop attenuation increases.

== Conceptual development ==
The concept of VDSL was first published in 1991 through a joint Bellcore-Stanford research study. The study searched for potential successors to the then-prevalent HDSL and relatively new ADSL, which were both 1.5 Mbit/s. Specifically, it explored the feasibility of symmetric and asymmetric data rates exceeding 10 Mbit/s on short phone lines.

VDSL2 standard is an enhancement to ITU T G.993.1 that supports asymmetric and symmetric transmission at a bidirectional net data rate up to 400 Mbit/s on twisted pairs using a bandwidth up to 35 MHz.

== VDSL standards ==
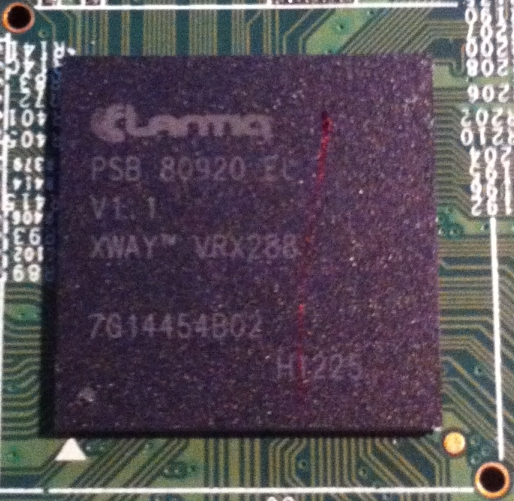
DSL SoC

A VDSL connection uses up to seven frequency bands, so one can allocate the data rate between upstream and downstream differently depending on the service offering and spectrum regulations. The first-generation VDSL standard specified both quadrature amplitude modulation (QAM) and discrete multi-tone modulation (DMT). In 2006, ITU-T standardized VDSL in recommendation G.993.2 which specified only DMT modulation for VDSL2.

Version	Standard name	Common name	Downstream rate	Upstream rate	Approved on
VDSL	ITU G.993.1	VDSL	55 Mbit/s	3 Mbit/s	2001-11-29
VDSL2	ITU G.993.2	VDSL2	200 Mbit/s	100 Mbit/s	2006-02-17
VDSL2-Vplus	ITU G.993.2; Amendment 1 (11/15)	VDSL2 Annex Q VPlus/35b	300 Mbit/s	100 Mbit/s	2015-11-06

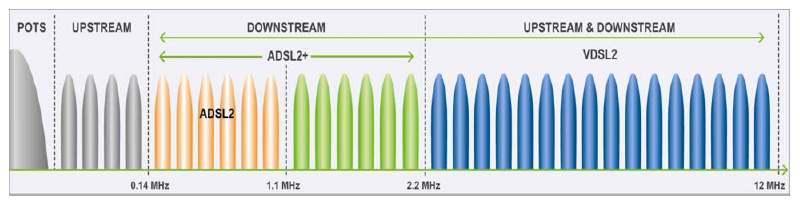

== VDSL2 ==
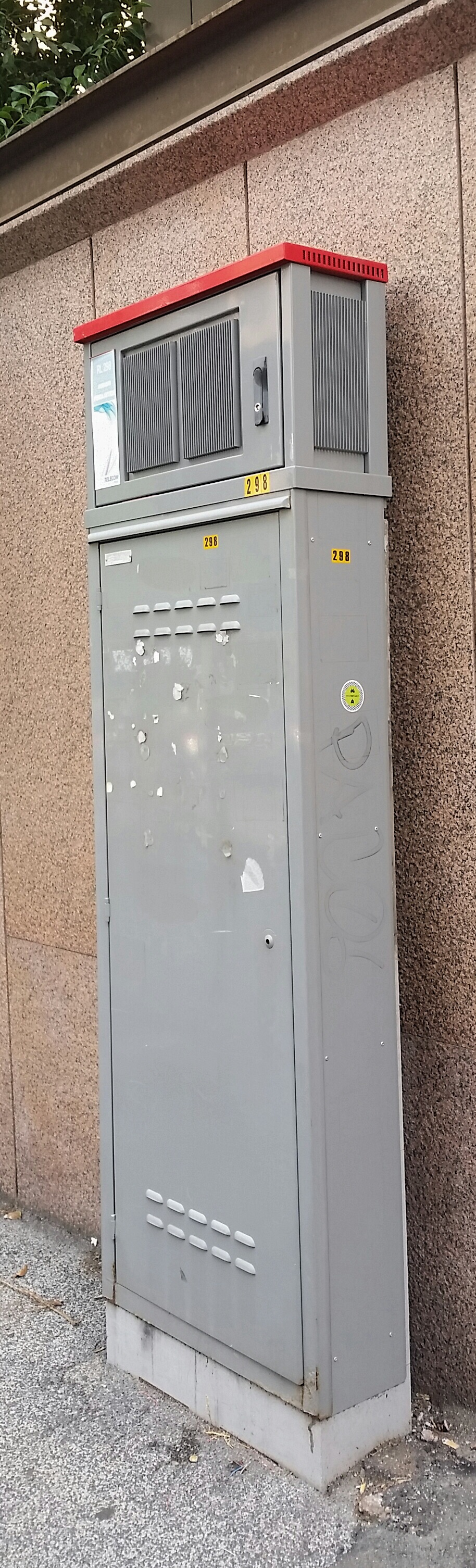
A VDSL2 cabinet on top of a copper cabling cabinet in Italy

VDSL2 is an enhancement to VDSL designed to support the wide deployment of triple play services such as voice, video, data and high-definition television (HDTV) VDSL2 is intended to enable operators and carriers to gradually, flexibly, and cost-efficiently upgrade existing xDSL infrastructure.

The protocol is standardized in the International Telecommunication Union telecommunications sector (ITU-T) as Recommendation G.993.2. It was announced as finalized on 27 May 2005, and first published on 17 February 2006. Several corrections and amendments were published from 2007 to 2011.

VDSL2 permits the transmission of asymmetric and symmetric aggregate data rates up to 300+ Mbit/s downstream and upstream on twisted pairs using a bandwidth up to 35 MHz on its latest version. It deteriorates quickly from a theoretical maximum of 350 Mbit/s at source to 100 Mbit/s at 500 metres (1,600 feet) and 50 Mbit/s at 1,000 metres (3,300 feet), but degrades at a much slower rate from there, and outperforms VDSL. Starting from 1,600 m (1 mi) its performance is equal to ADSL2+.

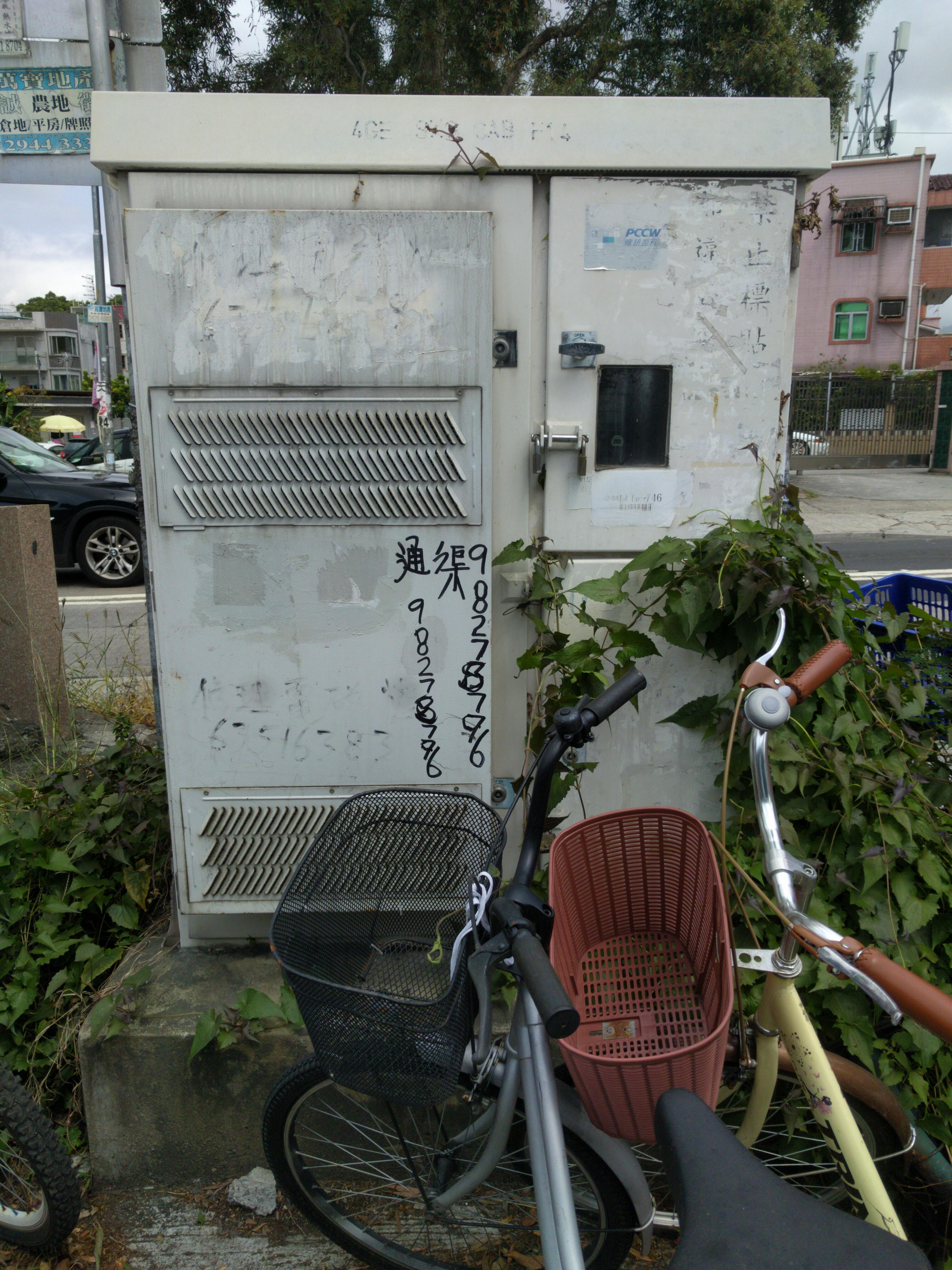
A VDSL2 DSLAM Cabinet installed by PCCW in Pat Heung, Hong Kong

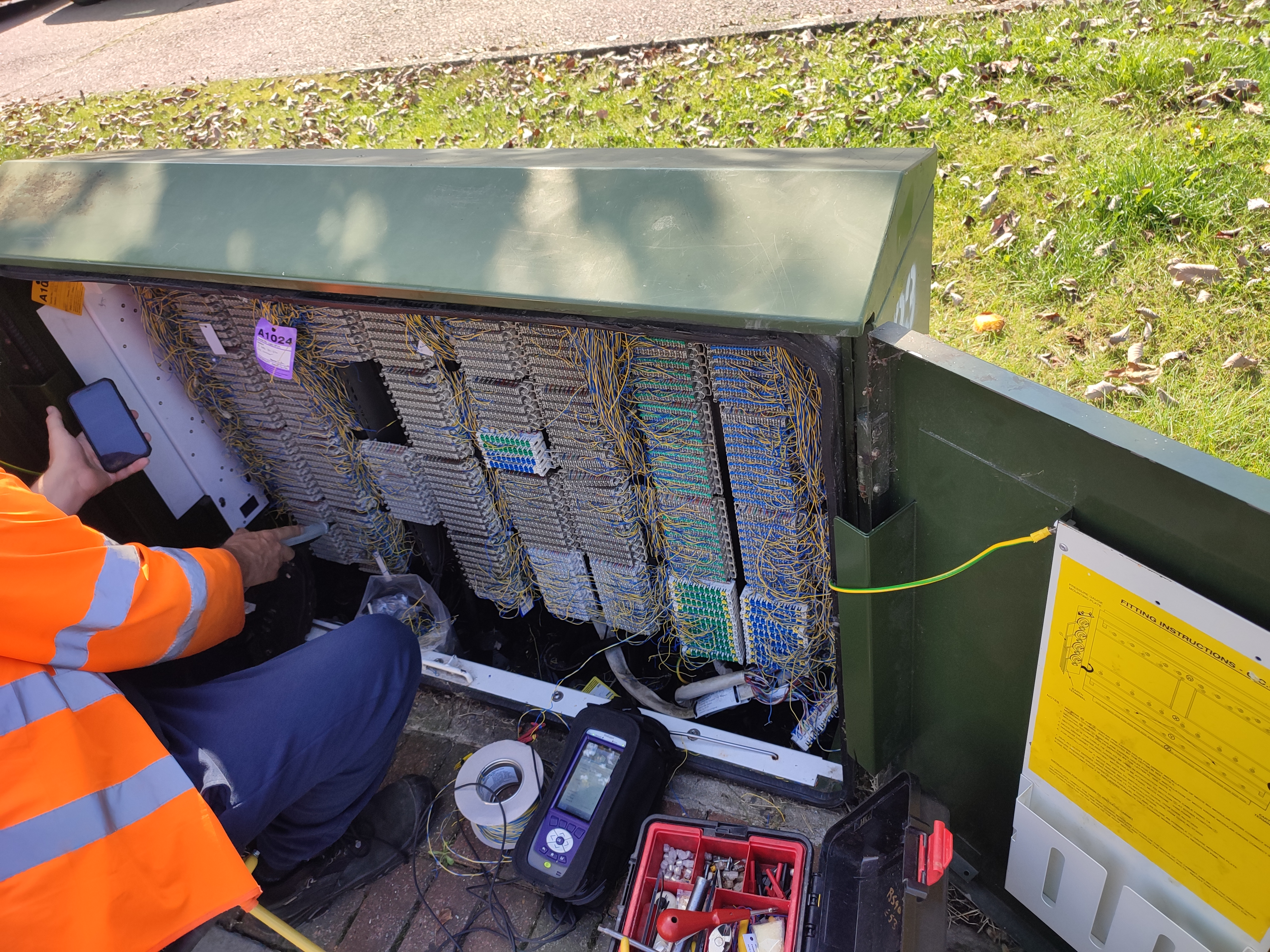
An Openreach engineer works at a UK VDSL cabinet

ADSL-like long-reach performance is one of the key advantages of VDSL2. LR-VDSL2 enabled systems are capable of supporting speeds of around 1–4 Mbit/s (downstream) over distances of 4–5 km (2.5–3.1 mi), gradually increasing the bit rate up to symmetric 100 Mbit/s as loop-length shortens. This means that VDSL2-based systems, unlike VDSL systems, are not limited to short local loops, multitenant units (MTUs), or multidwelling units (MDUs) only, but can also be used for medium range applications.

Bonding (ITU-T G.998.x) may be used to combine multiple wire pairs to increase available capacity, or extend the copper network's reach. Hybrid Access Networks can be used to combine xDSL with wireless networks. This enables network operators to provide faster Internet access services over long lines.

=== Vplus/35b ===
Vplus is a technology to achieve higher speeds over existing VDSL2 networks. It was developed by Alcatel-Lucent and standardised in November 2015 in ITU G.993.2 Amendment 1 as VDSL2 profile 35b. It promises to deliver speeds of up to 300 Mbit/s downstream and 100 Mbit/s upstream on loops shorter than 250 m. On longer loops, Vplus falls back to VDSL2 17a vectoring performance. Vplus uses the same tone spacing as VDSL2 17a to allow vectoring across Vplus (35b) and 17a lines, and thus mixed deployments and a smooth introduction of Vplus.

== Profiles ==
The VDSL1 standard has three bandplans: Annex A (Asymmetric BandPlan), Annex B (Symmetric BandPlan) and Annex C (Fx BandPlan). Annex A and Annex B were formerly called Plan 998 and Plan 997 respectively. VDSL1 Annex C is intended for use in Sweden only and it uses a variable separating frequency between the second downstream band, and the second upstream band. All VDSL1 bandplans have spectrum up to 12 MHz, so the length of the copper loops must be shorter than ADSL.

The VDSL2 standard defines a wide range of profiles that can be used in different VDSL deployment architectures; in the central office, in the cabinet or in the building for example.

Profile	Bandwidth (MHz)	Number of total carriers	Carrier bandwidth (kHz)	Maximum aggregate downstream transmit power (dBm)	Max. downstream throughput (Mbit/s)	Max. upstream throughput (Mbit/s)
8a	8.832	2048	4.3125	+17.5	50	16
8b	8.832	2048	4.3125	+20.5	50	16
8c	8.500	1972	4.3125	+11.5	50	16
8d	8.832	2048	4.3125	+14.5	50	16
12a	12	2783	4.3125	+14.5	68	22
12b	12	2783	4.3125	+14.5	68	22
17a	17.664	4096	4.3125	+14.5	150	50
30a	30.000	3479	8.625	+14.5	230	100
35b	35.328	8192	4.3125	+17.0	300	100

== VDSL2 vectoring ==
Vectoring is a transmission method that employs the coordination of line signals for reduction of crosstalk levels and improvement of performance. It is based on the concept of noise cancellation, much like noise-cancelling headphones. The ITU-T G.993.5 standard, "Self-FEXT cancellation (vectoring) for use with VDSL2 transceivers" (2010), also known as G.vector, describes vectoring for VDSL2. The scope of Recommendation ITU-T G.993.5 is specifically limited to the self-FEXT (far-end crosstalk) cancellation in the downstream and upstream directions. The far-end crosstalk (FEXT) generated by a group of near-end transceivers and interfering with the far-end transceivers of that same group is cancelled. This cancellation takes place between VDSL2 transceivers, not necessarily of the same profile. The technology is analogous to G.INP and Seamless Rate Adaptation (SRA).

Although technically feasible, as of 2022, vectoring is incompatible with local-loop unbundling, but future standard amendments could bring a solution.

== VDSL2+ Supervectoring ==
Supervectoring is an evolution of the vectoring technology invented and widely implemented by Deutsche Telekom, which further increases crosstalk and interference resistance and allows for stable internet at home connections at 250 Mbit/s downstream and 100 Mbit/s upstream.

== See also ==
- FS-VDSL
- List of interface bit rates
- List of VDSL and VDSL2 deployments
