= ANSI T1.413 Issue 2 =

ANSI T1.413 is a technical standard that defines the requirements for the single asymmetric digital subscriber line (ADSL) for the interface between the telecommunications network and the customer installation in terms of their interaction and electrical characteristics. ADSL allows the provision of voiceband services including plain old telephone service (POTS) and data services up to 56 kbit/s, and a variety of digital channels. In the direction from the network to the customer premises (downstream), the digital bearer channels may consist of full-duplex low-speed bearer channels and simpler high-speed bearer channels; in the other (upstream) direction, only low-speed bearer channels are provided.

== Description ==
The American National Standards Institute (ANSI) Telecommunications Committee created the first standardized ADSL specifications. They were published as ANSI T1.413-1995 and ANSI T1.413-1998 (sometimes called "issue 2") titled Network and Customer Installation Interfaces — Asymmetric Digital Subscriber Line (ADSL) Metallic Interface. It defines the minimum requirements for satisfactory performance of ADSL systems using the Discrete Multi-Tone (DMT) line code. DMT divides the useful bandwidth of the standard two wire copper medium used in the public switched telephone network (PSTN), which is 0 to 1104 kHz, into 256 separate 4.3125 kHz wide frequency bands called sub-carriers.

Up to 254 sub-carriers are used downstream; each of these 254 sub-carriers can support the modulation of 0 to 15 bits per baud. The baud is 4,000 symbols per second on each subcarrier. Thus the maximum theoretical downstream data rate of an ADSL system is 15.24 Mbit/s (254×15×4000). However, because the data is split up into packets (actually Reed–Solomon encoded codewords) of 255 bytes, the maximum achievable downstream data rate is 8.128 Mbit/s (including other overheads). It is possible to interleave two Reed-Solomon codewords and obtain one logical codeword of 510 bytes. If this is done, then the maximum theoretical downstream speed goes back up to around 15 Mbit/s.

In the upstream direction, a maximum of 30 sub-carriers can be used, again each frame modulated with up to 15 bits. Taken with the baud rate of 4,000 per second per subcarrier, the maximum throughput is just over 1.5 Mbit/s.

In order to combine voice telephone service with downstream and upstream ADSL signals the bandwidth is split into discrete parts using frequency-division multiplexing (FDM). In this case: 0–4 kHz is for voice, 26–138 kHz is the upstream band and 138–1104 kHz is the downstream band.
