= Downstream (networking) =

Residential services often have higher downstream rates than upstream, while business services are often symmetric.

In a telecommunications network or computer network, downstream refers to data sent from a network service provider to a customer.

One process sending data primarily in the downstream direction is downloading. However, the overall download speed depends on the downstream speed of the user, the upstream speed of the server, and the network between them.

In the client–server model, downstream can refer to the direction from the server to the client.
