= GenICam =

Programming interface for digital sensors

GenICam (abbreviated for Generic Interface for Cameras) is a generic programming interface for machine vision (industrial) cameras. The goal of the standard is to decouple industrial camera interfaces technology (such as GigE Vision, USB3 Vision, CoaXPress or Camera Link) from the user application programming interface (API). GenICam is administered by the European Machine Vision Association (EMVA). The work on the standard began in 2003 and the first module in GenICam, i.e., GenApi, was ratified in 2006 whereas the final module, i.e., GenTL was ratified in 2008.

Many companies in the machine vision industry have contributed to the standard. The main companies involved in drafting the GenICam standards are:

- Adimec
- Allied Vision Technologies
- Balluff (formerly known as MATRIX VISION GmbH which Balluff acquired in 2017)
- Basler AG
- Baumer
- DALSA
- e2v semiconductors
- Teledyne FLIR (formerly known as Point Grey Research Inc. which FLIR Systems Inc. acquired in 2016)
- JAI A/S
- Leutron Vision
- LUCID Vision Labs
- Matrox Imaging
- MVTec Software
- National Instruments
- Pleora
- Stemmer Imaging
- OMRON Sentech

Because many companies were involved in drafting the GenICam standard, and because of the potential benefits it seemed to offer, some camera manufacturers have already started to use GenICam in their products. However, many who helped develop the standard still use a proprietary SDK. For instance FLIR uses the Spinnaker SDK (https://www.ptgrey.com/spinnaker-sdk).

A common software interface that tries to support all genicam cameras is available: aravis.

GenICam consists of three modules to help solving the main tasks in machine vision field in a generic way. These modules are:

- GenApi: Using an XML description file, this is used to configure the camera and details how to access and control cameras;
- Standard Feature Naming Convention (SFNC): This is the recommended names and types for common features in cameras to promote interoperability;
- GenTL: This is the transport layer interface for enumerating cameras, grabbing images from the camera, and moving them to the user application.

GenICam provides support for five basic functions:

1. Configuring the camera—This function could support a range of camera features such as frame size, acquisition speed, pixel format, gain, image offset, etc.
2. Grabbing images—This function will create access channels between the camera and the user interface and initiates receiving images
3. Graphical user interface—This function enables user GUI interface to seamlessly talk to the camera(s)
4. Transmitting extra data—This function enables cameras to send extra data on top of the image data. Typical examples could be histogram information, time stamp, area of interest in the frame, etc.
5. Delivering events—This function enables cameras to talk to the application through an event channel.
