= Robert J. Shillman =

American businessman

- Born: April 6, 1946 (age 80); Boston, Massachusetts, U.S.
- Education: Northeastern University (B.S.E.E.); Massachusetts Institute of Technology (M.S.E.E. & Ph.D.)
- Occupations: Electrical engineer, businessman, philanthropist
- Title: CEO & Founder of Cognex Corporation

Academic background
- Thesis: Character recognition based on phenomenological attributes: theory and methods (1974)
- Doctoral advisor: Barry Blesser

Academic work
- Institutions: Tufts University; Cognex Corporation

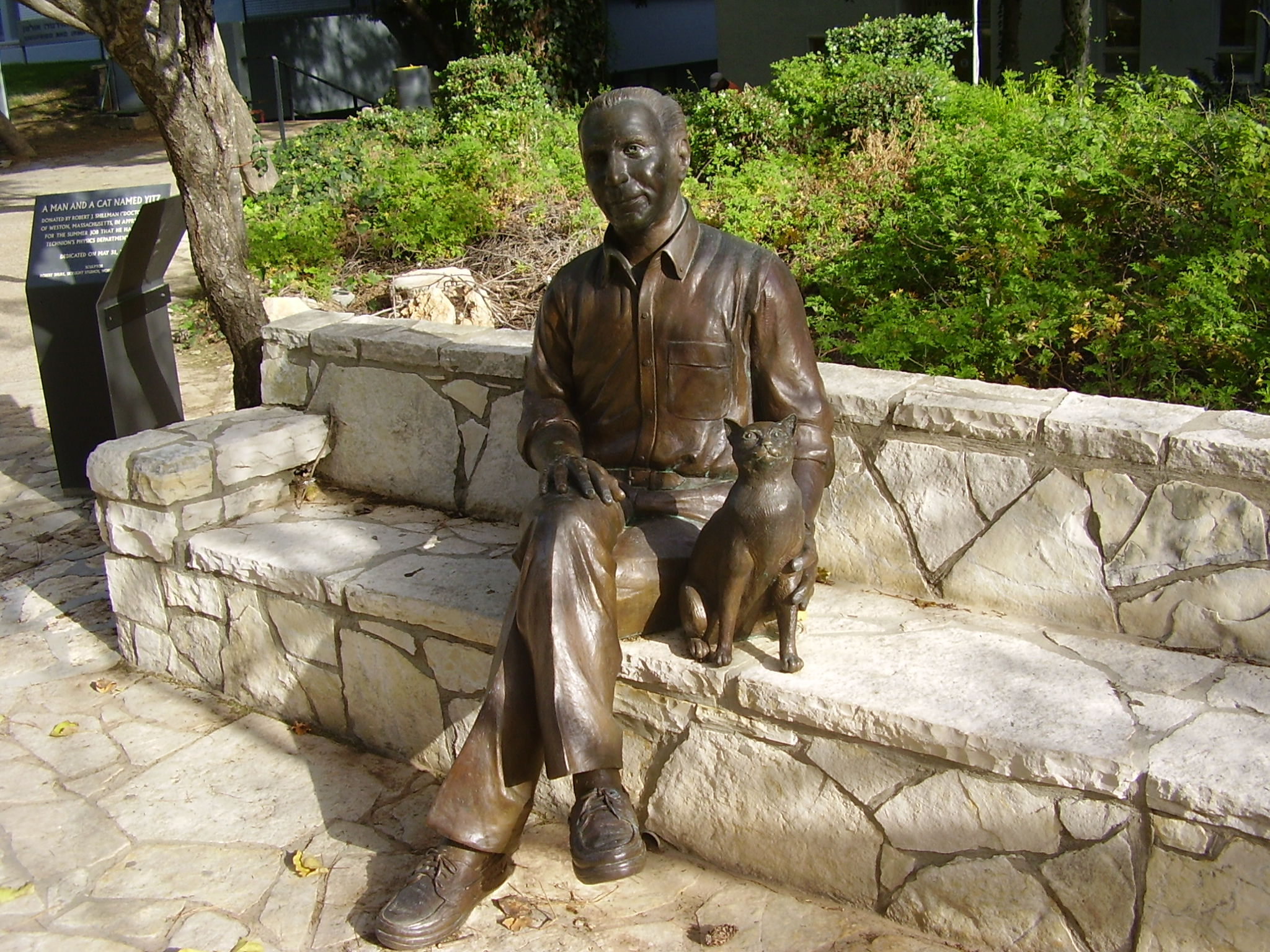
Statue of Robert J. Shillman with a cat called Yitz at Technion – Israel Institute of Technology

Robert Joel Shillman (born April 6, 1946) is an American businessman, electrical engineer and political financier. He is the founder and former chairman and chief culture officer of Cognex Corporation. Cognex is a provider of machine vision systems, sensors, and industrial ID readers used in automated manufacturing. Shillman holds a B.S.E.E. from Northeastern University as well as an M.S.E.E. and a Ph.D. from the Massachusetts Institute of Technology. He is a major donor to Israel and a number of international far-right activities.

== Founding Cognex ==
Shillman founded Cognex Corporation in 1981 while a member of the Electrical Engineering faculty of Tufts University. He left academia to start Cognex, investing his life savings of $86,000 into the company. He invited two MIT graduate students—Bill Silver and Marilyn Matz—to embark on this business venture with him, offering free racing bicycles to convince them to leave MIT for a summer. These three individuals gave Cognex its start and its name, which was derived from the phrase "Cognition Experts".

Cognex was one of the first companies to explore commercial applications for machine vision in the early 1980s. By the 1990s, Cognex's business had grown substantially due to the demand for machine vision to help automate semiconductor and electronics manufacturing. The company went public on the NASDAQ exchange in 1989.

== Professional recognition ==
Shillman was named Inc. magazine's Entrepreneur of the Year in 1990, received an Achievement Award in Leadership from the Automated Imaging Association in 1992, and received the North American SEMI Award in 2005 for his contributions to the semiconductor industry. He has published more than 20 technical papers and is recognized as an expert in the field of optical character recognition (OCR) and industrial uses of machine vision.

In June 2000, Shillman received an Honorary Doctorate in Business Administration from Northeastern University in recognition of his work in the field of machine vision technology in factory automation. In September 2008, Shillman was awarded an honorary Doctor of Science degree from Waseda University in Japan for his work in establishing an entrepreneurship program at Waseda and for his contribution to the development of machine vision systems.

== Professional activities ==
Shillman formerly sat on the board of trustees at the Northeastern University, and is considered a "Trustee Emeritus" by the university.

== Political activities ==
Shillman sits on boards of the Friends of the Israel Defense Forces, the Jewish Foundation for the Righteous, and the David Horowitz Freedom Center. In May 2008, President George W. Bush appointed him to serve on the Honorary Delegation to accompany him to Jerusalem for the celebration of the 60th anniversary of the State of Israel.

He has funded Brigitte Gabriel's ACT for America, James O'Keefe's Project Veritas, FrontPage Magazine and Rebel News, and has argued against the US accepting Syrian Muslim refugees.

He has been described as a counter-jihad "elite" and high-profile financier. In and around August 2017, he funded several far-right counter-jihad activists who were appointed "Shillman Fellows". Among these fellows were Laura Loomer, Raheem Kassam and Katie Hopkins.

In August 2018, it was revealed by The Times that Shillman had been providing finances to British far-right activist Tommy Robinson by helping to pay his "five figure salary".

In January 2021, it was revealed by OpenSecrets that Shillman paid nearly $214,000 in 2017 to help Dutch politician Geert Wilders pay for his successful legal defence in an indictment for hate speech against Muslims in general and Moroccans in particular.

In November 2025 it was revealed that he pulled a $2,000,000 pledge from Turning Point USA (co-founded by Charlie Kirk and Bill Montgomery) due to Charlie Kirk's involvement with Tucker Carlson.

== Philanthropy ==
He instituted the Cognex Community Donations Program, which supports several causes in the towns and cities where the company's regional offices are located.

Shillman also established the Perseverance Awards at Cognex to reward those individuals who have devoted significant time to the company's success. The awards increase in value, and when an employee reaches 25 years of service they are given the opportunity to become a philanthropist. The company sets up a charitable giving account in the employee's name and under their control, funded with $25,000 to donate to the employee's choice of IRS-approved charities.

Shillman has made substantial financial gifts to Northeastern University, which named a classroom building Shillman Hall in his honor, and to Waseda University, which named the building housing its Center for Entrepreneurship in his honor, and to the Technion – Israel Institute of Technology, which named the plaza of its physics center in his honor. He has endowed three professorships, the Robert J. Shillman Career Development Professorship at MIT, the Robert J. Shillman Trustee Professor of Entrepreneurship at Northeastern University and the Robert J. Shillman Career Advancement Chair at the Israel Institute of Technology.

Starting in 2006, Shillman has waived his annual salary and bonus at Cognex and has requested that those amounts be donated each year to charity.
