= Vision system =

Vision system may refer to:

- Visual system, the neurobiological circuitry and processing that enable living beings to see
- Machine vision, a computer-based system where software performs tasks assimilable to "seeing", usually aimed to industrial quality assurance, part selection, defect detection etc.
- Computer vision, an interdisciplinary study that deals with how computers can gain high-level understanding from digital images or videos
