= Cognex =

Cognex may mean:

- Cognex Corporation, a US manufacturer of machine vision systems
- Cognex, trade name of tacrine, a drug used to treat Alzheimer's disease
