= Clink =

Clink may refer to:

- The Clink, a historic prison in Southwark, England
- The Clink (restaurant), British restaurants employing prisoners for rehabilitation
- Prison, in general
- CLINK, an algorithm for hierarchical clustering
- Channel Link (C-Link), a high-speed data transmission interface
- A nickname for CenturyLink Field, in Seattle, Washington
- Clink is the English name for the Turkish dessert Kazandibi
- The sound "clink", a form of onomatopoeia
- C-Link, the closing track of Sir Paul McCartney's 2018 album Egypt Station
- Clink (TV series), a television prison drama series on 5Star
- Clink (FBNYV), a virulence protein produced by the faba bean necrotic yellows virus
