= CoaXPress =

Digital interface standard

CoaXPress (CXP) is a digital interface standard developed for high-speed image data transmission in machine vision applications. The name is a portmanteau of 'express' and 'coaxial' to emphasize CoaXPress is faster than other standards (e.g. Camera Link or GigE Vision) and uses 75 ohm coaxial cables as the physical transmission medium. CoaXPress is mostly used in digital imaging applications but it is also suitable for high-speed transmission of universal digital data.

A 'device' that generates and transmits data (e.g. an industrial digital camera) is connected with one or more coaxial cables to a 'host' that receives the data (e.g. a frame grabber board in a computer). The CoaXPress standard 1.0 and 1.1 supports bit rates up to 6.25 Gbit/s per coaxial cable and the new 2.0 standard supports bit rates up to 12.5 Gbit/s per coaxial cable from the 'device' to the 'host'. The number of cables is not limited by the standard. Some recent CoaXPress cameras and frame grabbers use 8 coaxial cables providing a maximum image data rate of about 48 GB/s. The older Camera Link standard can only carry up to 850 MB/s. A low-speed uplink, operating at up to 41.6 Mbit/s is available to control the 'device' or for triggering. A CoaXPress 'host' can supply 24 V over the coaxial cable up to 13 W per cable. The CoaXPress standard requires that both the 'device' and the 'host' support GenICam, a standardized generic programming interface. Unlike Camera Link (which is built upon pure LVDS with no transport layer), CoaXPress transmits data in packets using 8b/10b encoding and provides CRC. CoaXPress competes with the Camera Link HS standard of the Automated Imaging Association.

Today, version 3.0 of the CXP is available for data rates of 25 Gbit/s

== History ==
CoaXPress was developed by 6 companies, of whom Adimec, EqcoLogic (today: Microchip Technology), and Active Silicon were among the biggest drivers, in 2008. The goal was to develop a successor for the Camera Link standard for high-speed and data-rich vision related communication. The first joint effort "internally known as Visilink" was stopped. The CoaXPress standard was first demonstrated in November 2008 at the "Vision" trade show. After a good reception, the standard writing consortium of industrial companies consisting of Adimec, Eqcologic, Active Silicon, AVAL DATA, NED, and Components Express was formed early 2009. During the next Vision in 2009 the consortium was awarded the VisionAward for their efforts to further the cause of machine-vision applications. By this time the Japan Industrial Imaging Association has adopted CoaXPress to mature it into an official standard after which the first draft version 1.0 was presented in December 2010.

== Cabling and connectors ==
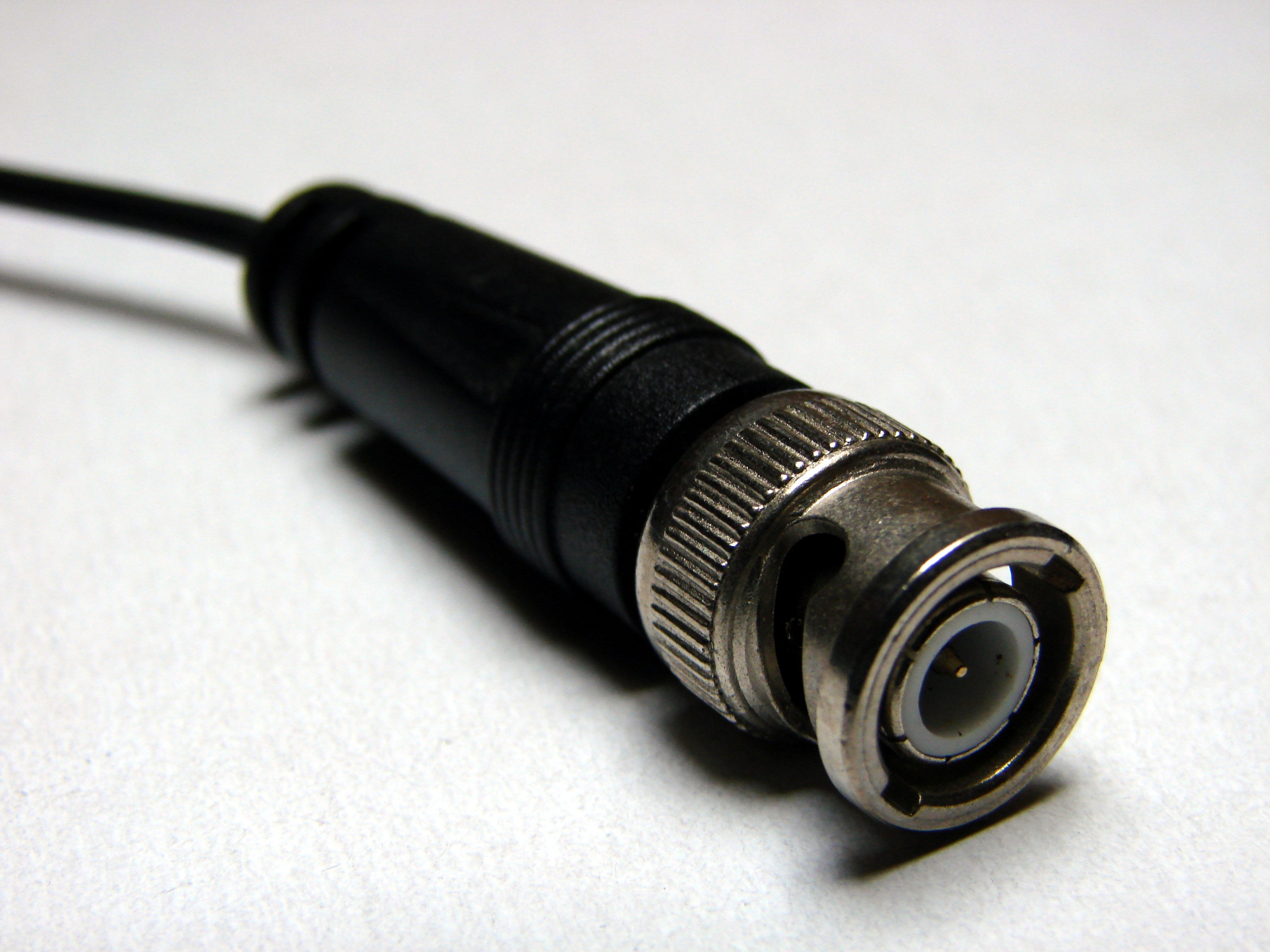
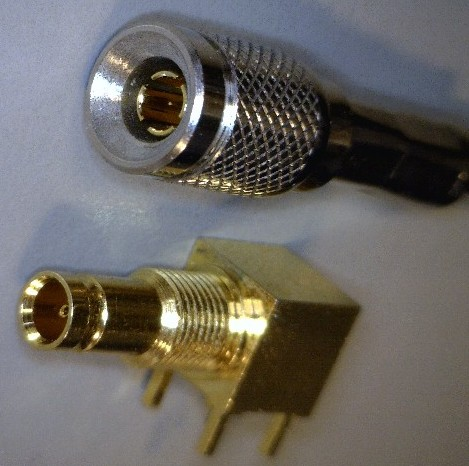
BNC connector (left) and DIN 1.0/2.3 connector (right)

The transmission medium for CoaXPress is coaxial cable with a characteristic impedance of 75 Ω. The maximum transmission distance is depending on the bit rate and the quality of the cable. RG-11, RG-6, RG-59, and other cable types can be used. It is also possible to reuse existing coaxial cable when upgrading from an analogue to a digital camera system.

The original connector for CoaXPress is a 75 Ω IEC 61169-8 BNC connector. The smaller DIN 1.0/2.3 connector was added in CoaXPress 1.1, and the Micro-BNC connector was then added to CoaXPress 2.0 for the new speeds faster than CXP-6. Most of recent camera and framegrabber products use either DIN 1.0/2.3 or Micro-BNC connectors and the IEC 61169-8 BNC has become rather rare. Solutions with a 5W5 connector have also been demonstrated, but this is not officially supported by the CoaXPress consortium.

== Variants ==
CoaXPress is a scalable standard and can be used for connections from 1.25 Gbit/s up to 25 Gbit/s and more. Note that the following chart represents typical practical cable lengths; the CoaXPress specification only specifies the electrical characteristics of CXP cables for each speed standard, it does not explicitly specify maximum lengths.

Name	Bit Rate	Maximum cable length if using Gepco VHD1100 cables	Maximum cable length if using Belden 1694A RG-6 cables
CXP-1	1.25 Gbit/s	212 m	130 m
CXP-2	2.5 Gbit/s	185 m	110 m
CXP-3	3.125 Gbit/s	169 m	100 m
CXP-5	5 Gbit/s	102 m	60 m
CXP-6	6.25 Gbit/s	60 m	40 m
CXP-10	10 Gbit/s		40 m
CXP-12	12.5 Gbit/s		30 m

== Low-speed uplink ==
CoaXPress supports a low-speed uplink channel from the frame grabber to the camera. This uplink channel has a fixed bit rate of 20.833 Mbit/s for 1.0 and 1.1 version of the standard and a bit rate of 41.667 Mbit/s for the 2.0 version of the standard. The uplink channel uses 8b/10b encoding. The uplink can be used for camera control, triggering, and firmware updates.

When using the multilane DIN 1.0/2.3 cabling solution an optional high-speed uplink can also be used, allowing 6.25 Gbit/s uplink communication to the camera. This can be used for very accurate triggering.

== Usage ==
The most common application is to interface cameras to computers (via a frame grabber) on applications (such as machine vision) which involve automated acquisition and analysis of images. Some cameras and frame grabbers have been introduced which support and utilize the CoaXPress interface standard.

== Implementation ==
At least two companies develop CoaXPress-compatible driver and equalizer devices: Microchip Technology (through its acquisition of EqcoLogic) and Macom. These devices must be used with FPGA devices, in order to implement CoaXPress standard protocol. Such standard implementation is executed using FPGA IP core, specially designed for this protocol, while it takes care of all the features defined by standard. Each side of the vision system, e.g. camera or frame grabber, requires dedicated FPGA IP core.

== See also ==
- List of interface bit rates
