= Savvas Chamberlain =

Savvas Chamberlain is a scientist, inventor, professor, and entrepreneur. In 1999, he was awarded a Distinguished Professor Emeritus of the University of Waterloo., where he remained for 25 years as a professor. During his time at the University of Waterloo, he invented many silicon image sensors, introduced new technology on MOSFET and Charge-coupled devices (CCDs) devices, and developed some fundamental theories.

== History ==
Chamberlain earned his M.Sc. and Ph.D. degrees from Southampton University in Great Britain. He taught at the University of Waterloo and performed research in the field of semiconductor devices and integrated circuits for over 25 years. His industrial experience includes research work with IBM and other companies. He has published more than 150 papers in scientific journals in the area of CCDs and semiconductor devices and has authored and co-authored more than 20 patents in the area of image sensors.

Using technology that Chamberlain developed from research at the University of Waterloo, he founded DALSA Corporation in 1980 (now Teledyne DALSA). While he was the CEO, the corporation became a leading international corporation in the digital imaging sector. The number of employees expanded from only a few to 1,100, and revenues were $212 million by the end of December 2010. He remained the CEO of the company until August 2007, and he resigned as chairman on February 12, 2011.

He is currently the CEO of EXEL Research Inc.

== Awards ==
In July 2009, Chamberlain was awarded Member of the Order of Canada. He was also awarded the AIA lifetime achievement award and was elected a Fellow of IEEE. In April 2007, he was awarded the Ontario Premier’s Catalyst award for innovation. In June 2007, the University of Waterloo awarded him the Honorary Doctor of Engineering Degree for his industrial contributions. In May 2008 was elected Fellow of The Canadian Academy of Engineering. In July 2010 he was made a Fellow of the Royal Society of Canada.
