= Remote guidance =

Remote supervision of a medical task

Remote guidance, in the medical context, refers to the supervision or guidance of a medical task, usually a procedure or test, from a remote location. This falls in the realm of real time telemedicine applications. By way of example, a radiologist may guide an ultrasound examination from a remote location. As such, the proximate requisite expertise to accomplish a medical task is significantly diminished. In the previous example, a diagnostic quality ultrasound can be accomplished by non-medically trained individuals manipulating an ultrasound device located with the patient under guidance from a remote location. This is an example of teleradiology If appropriately configured, the remote guidance can originate from another room or floor in the same building, too as far away as another continent or even planet. NASA researchers have successfully demonstrated remote guidance of diagnostic level cardiac ultrasonography using ultrasound on the space station, non-medical astronauts performing the exam as guided by a terrestrially located expert.

== Remote diagnostics ==
Remote diagnostics refers to a real time telemedical application that achieves diagnostic level quality and information exchange. In this sense, it refers to an expectation for quality sufficient for making or excluding a medical diagnosis. In the telemedical context specific to radiologic images these images often are consistent with the DICOM standard. Given bandwidth issues universally plaguing the healthcare environment imagery beyond still images and brief video has not yet become standard expectation of care environments or PACS systems. Ultrasound scanning commonly utilized for abdomen, musculoskeletal, pelvis, gynecologic, cardiac and vascular evaluations has shown potential for remote diagnosis only of late.

More general Remote Diagnostics (RD) refers to detecting which fault or faults are present in a system, body of object, from a distance. Examples of use: aeroplanes, spacecraft, Formula 1 and major assets such as ships, trains etc. In cases where corrective actions are also made, the term 'Remote Diagnostic & Maintenance' is more appropriate.

== Technical aspects ==
While still imagery can be e-mailed and forwarded in a multitude of methods, video product of medical devices has typically not been available for remote interaction. Recent improvements in scanning devices, for example ultrasound machines has facilitated this new capability. The inclusion of the VGA output gives the opportunity for frame grabber devices to stream such outputs to the internet.
