= Teledyne DALSA =

Canadian semiconductor manufacturer

- Type: Subsidiary of Teledyne Technologies
- Industry: Electronic Equipment
- Headquarters: Waterloo, Ontario, Canada
- Key people: Edwin Roks
- Number of employees: 1,000
- Parent: Teledyne Technologies (Canada)
- Website: www.teledynedalsa.com

Teledyne DALSA (formerly DALSA Corporation) is a Canadian company specializing in the design and manufacture of specialized electronic imaging components (image sensors, cameras, frame grabbers, imaging software) as well as specialized semiconductor fabrication (MEMS, high voltage ASICs). Teledyne DALSA is part of the Teledyne Imaging group, the leading-edge imaging companies aligned under the Teledyne umbrella.

== History ==
The company was founded in Waterloo, Ontario, Canada in 1980 by imaging pioneer Savvas Chamberlain, a former professor in electrical engineering at the University of Waterloo. It originally concentrated in developing and generating charge-coupled device (CCD) image sensor technology.

The company was capitalised in November 1984 and was publicly listed on the Toronto Stock Exchange in May 1996.

With a focus on semiconductor technology, DALSA employed approximately 1000 individuals worldwide as of 2011. Headquarters are located in Waterloo, Ontario, Canada, with additional operations in Billerica, Massachusetts; Santa Clara, California; Bromont and Montreal, Quebec; Eindhoven and Enschede, Netherlands, as well as sales offices in Germany, Japan, and China.

DALSA was acquired by Teledyne in February 2011.

== Technology and applications ==
The company designs and manufactures digital imaging products for industrial, scientific, and medical applications, including semiconductor wafer inspection, printed circuit inspection, general machine vision, digital radiography, medium format photography, aerial photogrammetry, and astronomy. Notably, many of the image sensors employed in NASA’s Spirit (2004), Opportunity (2004), and Curiosity (2011) Mars Rovers were manufactured by DALSA.

DALSA is one of few industrial digital camera producers that has a vertically integrated supply chain. In 2002, Dalsa bought the Bromont semiconductor wafer foundry from Zarlink Semiconductor Inc. DALSA owns the wafer forge where many of its imaging sensors are manufactured and is one of the few manufacturers offering both CCD and CMOS sensors.

In 2005 DALSA acquired Canadian frame grabber and camera manufacturer Coreco (based in Montreal). In doing so, Teledyne DALSA added software, acquisition and further gigabit Ethernet technology to its portfolio.

In 2003 DALSA introduced a digital cinema camera (the Origin camera system), but despite remarkable imaging performance the system was not a commercial success and the project was wound down in 2009. In 2007, it was redesigned to provide a better image output and was renamed the Dasla Origin II, later that same year the Evolution camera was also released.

In 2023, Teledyne DALSA announced the production of a new camera, the Linea2 4k Multispectral 5GigE.

== Recognition ==
In 2007, DALSA was named one of Canada's Top 100 Employers, as published in Maclean's magazine, one of a few manufacturing companies to receive this honour.

In 2010, Yole Développement named DALSA’s wafer foundry as "the leading independent pure‐play MEMS foundry worldwide".
