= Pleora =

Canadian company

Pleora Technologies
- Company type: Private
- Industry: Networked Video Connectivity, Ethernet, Machine Vision,
- Founded: 2000
- Headquarters: Ottawa, ON and Quebec, QC
- Key people: George Chamberlain, CEO
- Website: http://www.pleora.com

Pleora Technologies Inc. is a privately held Canadian company that specializes in video transmitters and receivers that enable the streaming of data or video in real-time over standard Gigabit Ethernet networks. The company was founded in 2000 by George Chamberlain and Alain Rivard.

== Services ==
Pleora works with integrators and manufacturers designing real-time imaging systems for the industrial automation, military, and medical sectors. The company provides hardware solutions (external frame grabbers and embedded video interfaces) that stream imaging and sensor data over Ethernet or USB networks, software for device management, image acquisition and display, and custom solutions. The company's products are designed into a diverse range of applications, including automated inspection systems, local situational awareness in military vehicles, and X-ray flat panel detectors.

== History ==
In 2003, Pleora served as a key member of a team of 12 leading industry players who initiated development of a standard for the delivery of high-speed imaging data over Gigabit Ethernet. The management of the standard later moved to the Automated Imaging Association (AIA) and became known as the GigE Vision Standard initiative. Version 1.2 of the GigE Vision standard was ratified in January 2010.

Pleora's hardware and software products have received numerous awards, including the Frost & Sullivan 2007 Product Innovation Award (iPORT Connectivity Solution) and Best Software in Advanced Imaging Pro's 2007 Readers Choice Awards (eBUS Driver Suite).

Pleora has a global network of partners and distributors and is headquartered in Ottawa, Ontario, Canada.
