= DIN 1.0/2.3 =

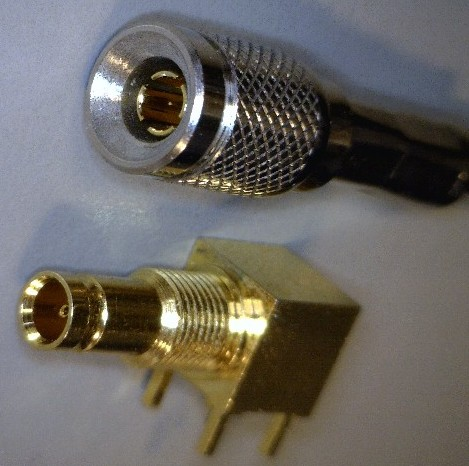
DIN 1.0/2.3 connector

The DIN 1.0/2.3 connector is an RF connector used for coaxial cable at microwave frequencies. They were introduced in the 1990s for telecommunication applications. They are available in 50 Ω and 75 Ω impedance and are compatible with the most widely used cable sizes. It has a push/pull lock and release feature. The DIN 1.0/2.3 is ideally suited to applications where space limitation is a factor. In broadcasting applications the 75 Ω version is used for serial digital interface video data up to maximum frequency of 4 GHz. The 50 Ω connector can be used to a maximum of 10 GHz.

== Not to be confused with ==
- DIN connector
- 7/16 DIN connector
- Mini-DIN connector

== Use of 75 ohm version ==
- CoaXPress
- AES3

== See also ==
- BNC connector
- Coaxial cable
- RF connector
