= Lens controller =

A lens controller is device that controls motorized photographic lens functions such as zoom, focus, and iris opening (aperture). Lens controllers can be found in still camera photographic lenses and as stand-alone units in machine vision, remote sensing, optoelectronics systems, and security applications.

== Types ==
=== Internal ===
Internal photographic lens controllers take information from the camera or lens elements and perform automatic and manual focusing and aperture adjustment. They are frequently contained inside as part of a modern zoom lens and used mainly for photography.

=== Stand-alone ===
Stand-alone lens controllers are attached to a photographic lens by a cable to allow operator manual control of lens functions.

=== Machine vision, CCTV, and computer vision ===
Lens controllers for machine vision are universal devices designed to control lenses from multiple manufacturers. Although there is no standard for wiring of lenses most have direct current (DC) motors attached to lens elements and are controlled with ±6 VDC, ±8 VDC or ±12 VDC.

Machine vision lens controllers come in manual or computerized varieties.

Manual lens controllers are composed of switches and a power supply. When the operator actuates a switch, a function of the lens is enabled. Manual control requires an operator to view the image through the lens in which adjustment is taking place. Manual lens controllers are the most common and are frequently used in CCTV security systems.

Computerized lens controllers are composed of a computer, electronic switches such as H-Bridges or relays, a power supply, and an electronic interface. A remote computer sends a command to the lens controller through an RS-232, RS-485, USB, or Ethernet interface to actuate a lens function. The lens controller will then perform the command automatically. If a lens is equipped with presets, potentiometers attached to lens components that measure the position of that function, then the controller can work in a closed loop and move to a specific position. If the lens is not equipped with presets, then the controller can only move a lens function to an approximate position.
