= Cognex Corporation =

American manufacturer of machine vision systems

Coordinates: 42.30213°N 71.35534°W

- Type: Public
- Traded as: Nasdaq: CGNX; S&P 400 Component
- Industry: Industrial automation (hardware and software)
- Founded: 1981; 45 years ago
- Headquarters: Natick, Massachusetts, United States
- Key people: Matt Moschner (president and CEO); Sheila DiPalma (EVP, employee services); Dennis Fehr (SVP, CFO)
- Products: Vision Systems, Vision Sensors, Vision Software, ID Readers
- Revenue: ▲$994 million USD (2025)
- Net income: ▲$114 million USD (2025)
- Number of employees: 3000
- Website: www.cognex.com

Cognex Corporation is an American manufacturer of machine vision systems, software and sensors used in automated manufacturing to inspect and identify parts, detect defects, verify product assembly, and guide assembly robots. Cognex is headquartered in Natick, Massachusetts, USA and has offices in more than 20 countries.

Cognex began exploring commercial applications of machine vision in the early 1980s. In the 1990s, Cognex's business grew due to a demand for machine vision tools to help automate semiconductor and electronics manufacturing. While semiconductor manufacturing remains an important market for Cognex, it has expanded to general manufacturing applications.

The company's product portfolio includes In-Sight, VisionPro software, and DataMan.

== History ==
Cognex Corporation was founded in 1981 by Robert J. Shillman, a lecturer in human visual perception at the Massachusetts Institute of Technology, and two MIT graduate students, Bill Silver and Marilyn Matz. Cognex stands for "Cognition Experts".

The company's first vision system, DataMan, was introduced in 1982. DataMan was an optical character recognition (OCR) system designed to read, verify, and assure the quality of letters, numbers, and symbols printed on products and components. The company's first customer was a typewriter manufacturer that purchased DataMan to read letters on typewriter keys and ensure that they were located in the correct position.

In 1989, Cognex went public on the NASDAQ exchange for $1.38 per share—within a year, the stock price had tripled.

In 1995, Cognex purchased Acumen, a U.S. based developer of wafer identification systems.

In 2004, the company won an intellectual property victory when a federal judge ruled in Cognex's favor in a patent lawsuit brought against the estate of the inventor Jerome H. Lemelson, who had filed dozens of submarine patents, some of which purported to cover machine vision processes. The machine vision-related patents were held invalid. The ruling was upheld by the Court of Appeals for the Federal Circuit.

Cognex sold off its in-vehicle product in 2007, citing concerns about profitability and intellectual property issues.

In 2015 Cognex sold off its Surface Vision Division and the associated range of products SmartView (web inspection), Vision Gear (slit inspection), Smart Advisor (process surveillance, web monitoring) and VisionPro Surface to Ametek Inc. for approximately 160M US$. The sold division represented about 12% of Cognex in terms of revenue and number of employees.

In April 2017 Cognex acquired ViDi Systems, a Swiss-based provider of deep learning software for industrial machine vision applications. In October 2019 Cognex acquired Sualab, a Korean-based developer of vision software using deep learning for industrial applications.

During summer 2020 Cognex laid off 8% of its headcount (190 employees). In December 2020 Cognex announced payment of $2 dividend per share. In the press release explaining this special dividend the chairman, Robert J. Shillman, referred to one of the company's mottos, to explain the highest dividend paid out in the company's history. This motto being: “When Cognex wins, we all win”.

On February 11, 2021, Cognex announced the resignation of Robert Shillman from the company's board of directors and as an executive officer of Cognex, effective May 5, 2021.

== Products ==
Some of the products produced by Cognex are:

- In-Sight - a vision system that combines a camera, software and processor into one compact unit. In April 2020, Cognex introduced the In-Sight D900 embedded vision system, which features deep learning software inside an In-Sight industrial-grade smart camera. The system is designed to solve complex in-line inspection applications including optical character recognition (OCR), assembly verification, and defect detection.
- VisionPro vision software.
- DataMan - a family of fixed mount and handheld ID readers used to identify and track items by reading 1D and 2D Data Matrix codes.
- 3D Sensors
