= Channel Link =

Channel-Link (C-Link) by National Semiconductor is a high-speed interface for cost-effectively transferring data at rates from 250 megabits/second to 6.4 gigabits/second over backplanes or cables. National Semiconductor introduced the first Channel-Link chipsets in the late 1990s to provide an alternative to continually widening data buses to get higher throughput.

Channel-Link uses LVDS, and comes in configurations with three, four, or eight parallel data transfer lanes plus the source-synchronized clock for each configuration. In cable applications, it uses one twisted pair in order to transmit a clock signal, and on the remaining differential pairs it transmits digital data at a bit rate that is seven times the frequency of the clock signal. The backplane applications work the same way except for using differential traces instead of twisted pairs.

The three Channel-Link chipset configurations provide varying user interfaces. For example, the three-lane chipset has 21 single-ended inputs and outputs for the user interface, and the four-lane chipset has 28 single-ended inputs and outputs. The eight-lane chipset has 48 single ended inputs and outputs because it uses one of the 7 serialized bits/lane to DC-balance the other six bits.

== System applications ==
Camera Link is the biggest application for Channel-Link in 2009. It uses the 28-bit Channel-Link version and specifies for a clock rate up to 85 MHz for a total throughput of 2.38 Gbit/s. It also has a provision for placing 3 chipsets in parallel for a total throughput over 7 Gbit/s.

Telecommunication access-aggregator equipment is another popular Channel-Link application. For example, second generation (2G) and 2.5G mobile phone base stations use Channel-Link to transfer data between radio cards and baseband processing cards. It also provides for the equivalent data transfers in DSL and multiservice access multiplexors.

Multi-function printers are another major application for Channel-Link. It transfers the data over cables between the modules inside the printers. For example, the scanner module sends image data streams to the processing engine module.

Because Channel-Link is a general-purpose data pipe with no overhead for protocol or encoding, there are many more system applications for this data transfer technology.

== See also ==
- Camera Link
