= Frame grabber =

Device that captures still frames from video

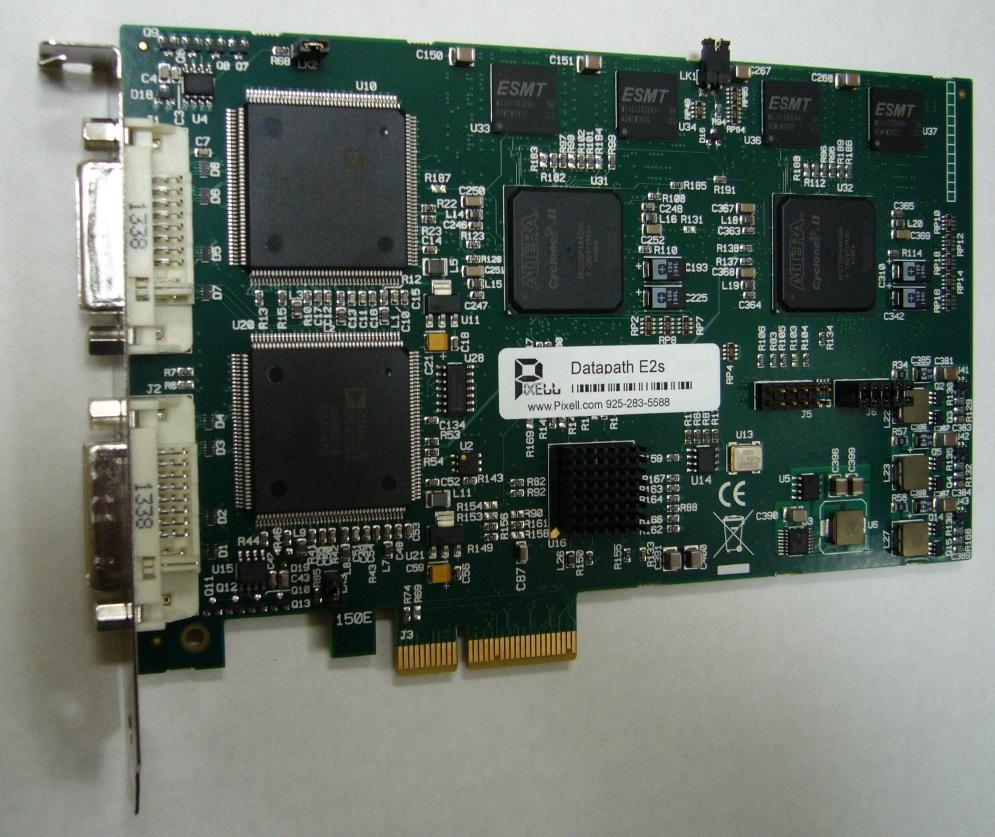
A DataPath VisionRGB-E2s expansion card with two frame grabbers

A frame grabber is an electronic device that captures (i.e., "grabs") individual, digital still frames from an analog video signal or a digital video stream. It is usually employed as a component of a computer vision system, in which video frames are captured in digital form and then displayed, stored, transmitted, analyzed, or combinations of these.

Historically, frame grabber expansion cards were the predominant way to interface cameras to PCs. Other interface methods have emerged since then, with frame grabbers (and in some cases, cameras with built-in frame grabbers) connecting to computers via interfaces such as USB, Ethernet and IEEE 1394 ("FireWire"). Early frame grabbers typically had only enough memory to store a single digitized video frame, whereas many modern frame grabbers can store multiple frames.

Modern frame grabbers often are able to perform functions beyond capturing a single video input. For example, some devices capture audio in addition to video, and some devices provide, and concurrently capture frames from multiple video inputs. Other operations may be performed as well, such as deinterlacing, text or graphics overlay, image transformations (e.g., resizing, rotation, mirroring), and conversion to JPEG or other compressed image formats. To satisfy the technological demands of applications such as radar acquisition, manufacturing and remote guidance, some frame grabbers can capture images at high frame rates, high resolutions, or both.

== Circuitry ==
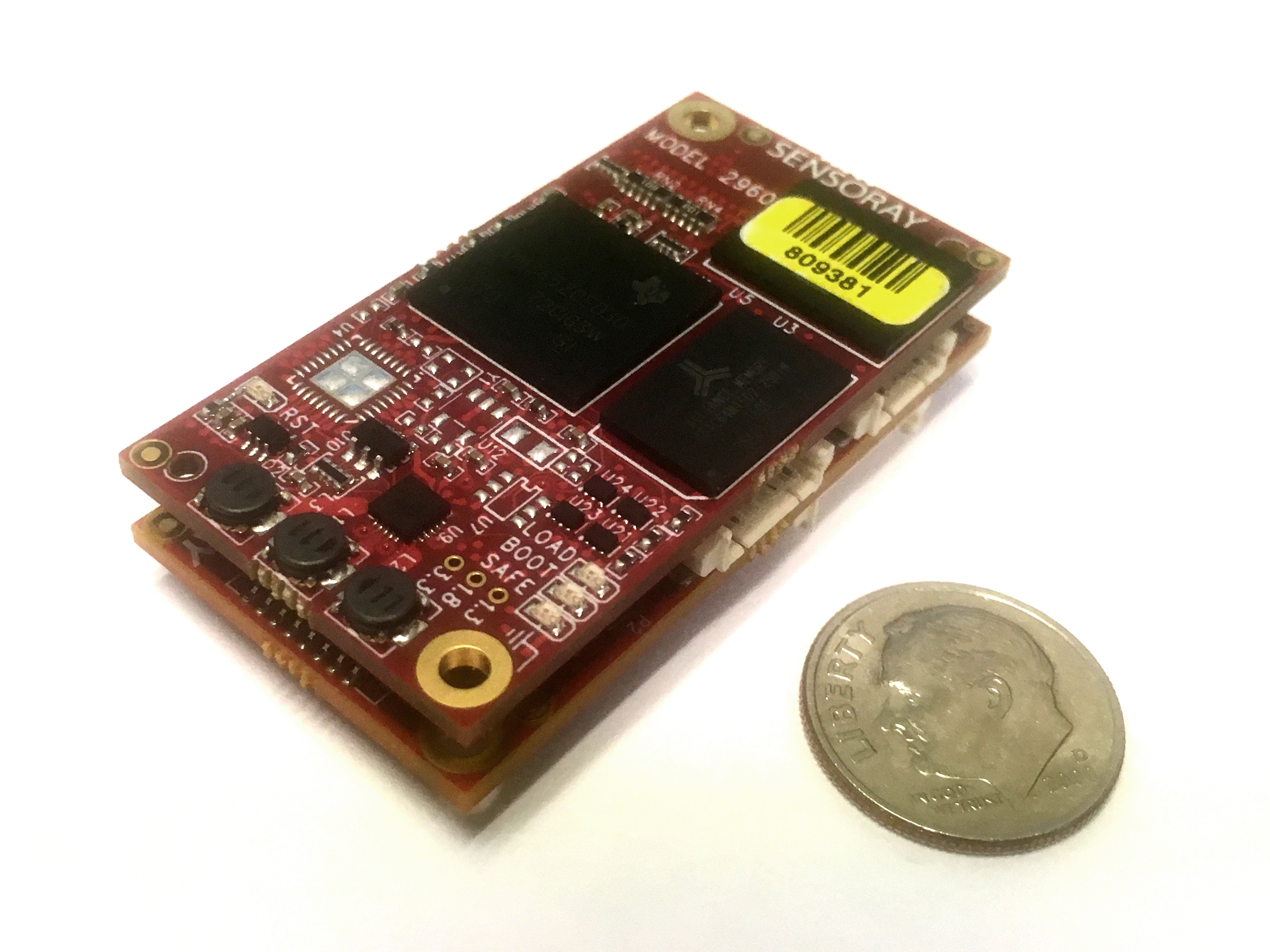
Analog HD frame grabber

Analog frame grabbers, which accept and process analog video signals, include these circuits:

- Input signal conditioner that buffers the analog video input signal to protect downstream circuitry
- Video decoder that converts SD analog video (e.g., NTSC, SECAM, PAL) or HD analog video (e.g., AHD, HD-TVI, HD-CVI) to a digital format

Digital frame grabbers, which accept and process digital video streams, include these circuits:

- Digital video decoder that interfaces to and converts a specific type of digital video source, such as Camera Link, CoaXPress, DVI, GigE Vision, HDMI, LVDS, or SDI

Circuitry common to both analog and digital frame grabbers:

- Memory for storing the acquired image (i.e., a frame buffer)
- A bus interface through which a processor can control the acquisition and access the data
- General purpose I/O for triggering image acquisition or controlling external equipment

== Applications ==
=== Healthcare ===
Frame grabbers are used in medicine for many applications, including telenursing and remote guidance. In situations where an expert at another location needs to be consulted, frame grabbers capture the image or video from the appropriate medical equipment, so it can be sent digitally to the distant expert.

=== Manufacturing ===
"Pick and place" machines are often used to mount electronic components on circuit boards during the circuit board assembly process. Such machines use one or more cameras to monitor the robotics that places the components. Each camera is paired with a frame grabber that digitizes the analog video, thus converting the video to a form that can be processed by the machine software.

=== Network security ===
Frame grabbers may be used in security applications. For example, when a potential breach of security is detected, a frame grabber captures an image or a sequence of images, and then the images are transmitted across a digital network where they are recorded and viewed by security personnel.

=== Personal use ===
In recent years with the rise of personal video recorders like camcorders, mobile phones, etc. video and photo applications have gained ascending prominence. Frame grabbing is becoming very popular on these devices.

=== Astronomy & astrophotography ===
Amateur astronomers and astrophotographers use frame grabbers when using analog "low light" cameras for live image display and internet video broadcasting of celestial objects. Frame grabbers are essential to connect the analog cameras used in this application to the computers that store or process the images.

== See also ==
- Tweening
- Video capture
- TV tuner card
- Automated Imaging Association (AIA)
