= Automated Imaging Association =

- Industry: Machine Vision
- Founded: 1984
- Headquarters: Ann Arbor, USA
- Key people: 2018–19 Board of Directors include: Wallace Latimer, Chair; FISBA, Steve Wardell, Vice Chair; ATS Automation, Jeffery Bernstein, President; AIA, Ghislain Beaupre, Vice President R&D and Operations; Teledyne Dalsa, Dave Curley, Vice President Sales & Marketing; Pleora Technologies, Gregory Hollows, Director; Edmund Optics, Rex Lee Ph.D; Pyramid Imaging, Inc, Marc Marini, Director R&D, Vision and Motion; National Instruments, John Merva, Vice President North America; Fardasoft Vision, Rusty Ponce de Leopn, President; Phasae 1 Technology Corp, Edward Roney, National Accounts Manager, Intelligent Robotics; FUNUC America Corporation.
- Website: www.visiononline.org

Automated Imaging Association (AIA) is the world's largest machine vision trade group. AIA has more than 350 members from 32 countries, including system integrators, camera, lighting and other vision components manufacturers, vision software providers, OEMs and distributors. The association's headquarters is located in Ann Arbor, Michigan. Now part of A3; the Association for Advancing Automation AIA joins RIA; Robotic Industries Association, MCMA, Motion Control & Motor Association and A3 Mexico to form one of the largest collaborative trade association. All organizations offer industry training, news and member benefits.

== Standards ==
The Camera Link, Camera Link HS, GigE Vision, and USB3 Vision communication protocols are maintained and administered by the Automated Imaging Association (AIA).

Camera Link, Camera Link HS, GigE Vision, and USB3 Vision, are all available for public download on their Vision Online website. Manufacturers of vision products using the standard must license the standard.

== Notable members ==
Sony is among the multi-billion dollar member companies in the AIA. Cognex Corporation and National Instruments are also two big names in the machine vision industry that are members of the AIA. In 2010, 51% of the members are from North America, 30% are from Europe, 15% are from Eastern Asia, less than 1% are from South America, 2% are from Western Asia, less than 1% are from Southern Asia, 1% are from Southeastern Asia and less than 1% of the members are from Australia.
