= GigE Vision =

Video interface protocol over Ethernet cables

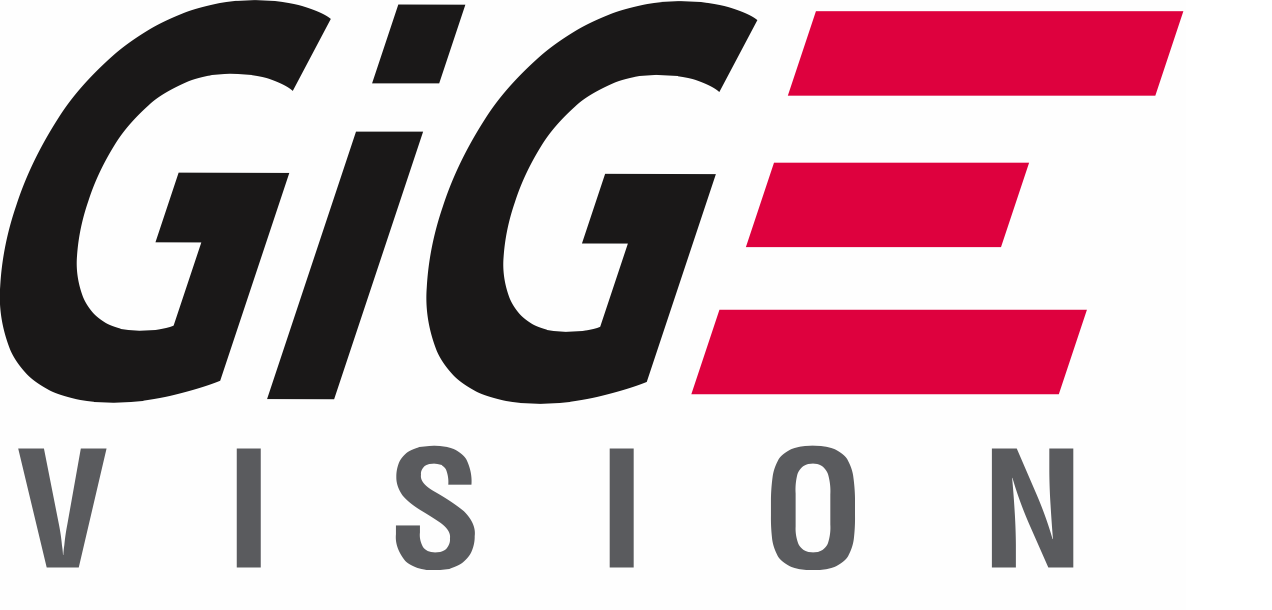
- Type: Incentive
- Industry: Vision
- Founded: 2006; United States
- Headquarters: United States

GigE Vision is an interface standard introduced in 2006 for high-performance industrial cameras. It provides a framework for transmitting high-speed video and related control data over Ethernet networks. The distribution of software or development, manufacture or sale of hardware that implement the standard, require the payment of annual licensing fees. The standard was initiated by a group of 12 companies, and the committee has since grown to include more than 50 members. The 12 founding members were: Adimec, Atmel, Basler AG, CyberOptics, Teledyne DALSA, JAI A/S, JAI PULNiX, Matrox, National Instruments, Photonfocus, Pleora Technologies and Stemmer Imaging. The Association for Advancing Automation (A3) oversees the ongoing development and administration of the standard.

GigE Vision is based on the Internet Protocol standard. One goal is to unify current protocols for industrial cameras. The other is to make it easier for 3rd party organizations to develop compatible software and hardware.

GigE Vision is not an open protocol, and as such a special license is required to develop GigE camera drivers.

== Technology ==
GigE Vision has four main elements:

- GigE Vision Control Protocol (GVCP)—Runs on the UDP protocol. The standard defines how to control and configure devices. Specifies stream channels and the mechanisms of sending image and configuration data between cameras and computers.
- GigE Vision Stream Protocol (GVSP)—Runs on the UDP protocol. Covers the definition of data types and the ways images can be transferred via GigE.
- GigE Device Discovery Mechanism—Provides mechanisms to obtain IP addresses.
- XML description file based on a schema defined by the European Machine Vision Association's GenICam standard that allows access to camera controls and image streams.

== See also ==
- Automated Imaging Association
- Camera Link
