= Shlomo Rakib =

Israeli electrical engineer

- שלמה רכב
- Born: Israel
- Citizenship: Dual: USA & Israel
- Occupation: Electrical engineer

Academic background
- Education: Technion University

Academic work
- Discipline: Electrical engineering

Shlomo Rakib (Hebrew: שלמה רכב) is an Israeli electrical engineer known for his work on Orthogonal Time Frequency and Space (OTFS) and other engineering topics. He is the holder of several patents and co-founder and current Chief Technology Officer of Cohere Technologies, which he had co-founded with Ronny Hadani. He also co-founded Terayon in 1993.

== Education ==
Rakib received a Bachelor of Science in Electrical Engineering from Technion University in Israel. The university's Shlomo Rakib Fellowship Fund is named after him.

== Career ==
In the 1980s, Rakib served as a communications engineer in the Israeli Navy. Rakib also served as Chief Engineer at the communications products company PhaseCom from 1981 to 1993. As part of PhaseCom, he developed data and telephony applications.

Shlomo Rakib founded Terayon in 1993 with his brother Zaki Rakib (IPO in 1998). The company initially sold modems before developing other types of broadband technology. Rakib served as the company's president and CTOs.

Rakib invented Terayon's S-CDMA technology, which is a component of the DOCSIS 2.0 cable data specification used in cable modems. As part of Terayon, he also developed data transmission methods utilizing Asynchronous Transfer Mode (ATM) and S-CDMA. Rakib resigned as Terayon's president in 2004. The firm was acquired in 2007 by Motorola. This S-CDMA technology that Rakib developed allowed for more efficient utilization of the available bandwidth by allowing multiple signals to occupy the same frequency spectrum simultaneously. It also improved security and reduced interference.

In 2004, Rakib co-founded Novafora, a company that developed microprocessors for advanced video applications. The firm acquired semiconductor and microprocessor company Transmeta in 2009 before it eventually closed in the same year.

Rakib and Ronny Hadani co-founded Cohere Technologies in 2009. They met at one of Hadani's lectures about Orthogonal Time Frequency and Space (OTFS) at the University of Texas at Austin. and founded the company after Rakib devised the idea to apply OTFS to wireless technology and signal processing. The firm focuses on wireless improvements using OTFS and the Delay-Doppler model to improve FDD/TDD spectrum performance.

In 2012, Rakib founded Gainspeed, a company specializing in DAA (Distributed Access Architecture). The company was initially known as Cohere Networks before being renamed Gainspeed in 2013. The firm was acquired by Nokia in 2016.

In 2021, Rakib became a member of CableLabs' Convergence Council, an advisory board focused on building convergence in the cable industry.

== Selected publications ==
Rakib's work has been cited by other scholars over 600 times. His work has also been cited in textbooks. His notable works include:

- Rakib, S. (1997). An innovative cable modem system for broadband communication. 24 - 30. doi:10.1049/cp:19971238.
- Zarai, Y., & Rakib, S. (2008). Hilbert space-filling by piecewise-linear index transformation. IEEE Signal Processing Letters, 15, 717-720.
- Monk, A., Hadani, R., Tsatsanis, M., & Rakib, S. (2016). OTFS - orthogonal time frequency space. arXiv preprint arXiv:1608.02993.
- Hadani, R., Rakib, S., Tsatsanis, M., Monk, A., Goldsmith, A. J., Molisch, A. F., & Calderbank, R. (2017, March). Orthogonal time frequency space modulation. In 2017 IEEE Wireless Communications and Networking Conference (WCNC) (pp. 1–6). IEEE.
- Hadani, R., Rakib, S., Molisch, A., Ibars, C., Monk, A., Tsatsanis, M., Delfeld, J., Goldsmith, A. & Calderbank, R. (2017). Orthogonal Time Frequency Space (OTFS) modulation for millimeter-wave communications systems. 681-683. doi:10.1109/MWSYM.2017.8058662.
- “Representation theoretic patterns in three dimensional cryo-electron microscopy III - Presence of Point Symmetries.” Gurevich, S., Hadani, R. and Singer, A. (In preparation).

== Selected research ==
Rakib has been granted more than 150 patents during the last few decades. Notable patents include (among others):

- US Patent 8170392, Rakib, S.S., Bronstein, A., Bronstein, M., Devictor, G.B.M., "Method and apparatus for generation, distribution and display of interactive video content"
- US Patent 8547988, Hadani, R. & Rakib, S.S., "Communications method employing orthonormal time-frequency shifting and spectral shaping"
- US Patent 8879378, Hadani, R. & Rakib, S.S., "Orthonormal time-frequency shifting and spectral shaping communications method"
- US Patent 9590779, Hadani, R. & Rakib, S.S, "Modulation and equalization in an orthonormal time-frequency shifting communications system"

== See also ==
- Terayon
