= Com21 =

American networking equipment manufacturer

Com21, Inc.
- Type: Public
- Traded as: Nasdaq: CMTO
- Industry: Computer networking
- Founded: 1992; 34 years ago
- Defunct: 2003
- Fate: Bankruptcy
- Headquarters: Milpitas, California
- Number of employees: 260 (2000)
- Website: com21.com at the Wayback Machine (archived 2002-11-29)

Com21, Inc., was an early pioneer in developing cable modem networks in the era before the standard DOCSIS was introduced for Internet access via cable television networks. The company filed for bankruptcy in 2003.

== History ==
Com21, Inc., was an American public company. Com21 shares traded on Nasdaq using CMTO as symbol. The headquarters of the company was located in Milpitas, California. Com21 had offices in 13 countries. The European head office was located in Delft and had a development centre in Cork, Ireland. In 2000 the company had over 260 employees.

== Products ==
Com21 was quite successful with their cable modem line of products in the years before the new standard DOCSIS was available. The Com21 portfolio can be divided into three segments: the central or head end equipment, cable modems or CPE, and the management platform.

=== ComController ===
The central system, typically installed in the head end or CATV hub locations were called ComControllers. A ComController provided the same function as a CMTS in modern Docsis networks. A ComController was a 19" rack module that was built around an integrated ATM switch and needed several modules to become a functional cable modem head end system. The main components or modules in a ComController were:

- the management module (one per system)
- the downstream HF controller (one per system)
- upstream HF controllers, each providing two upstream channels (at least one per system)
- network controllers, providing interconnection with the internet (or private IP network)

The management module provided the interface between each ComController system and the Com21 network management platform NMAPS. The management module offered a single Ethernet interface to an out of band management network.

Each ComController had one HF Downstream module. The downstream controller had two F-connector interfaces to connect a coax cable towards the distribution section of a hybrid fibre coax cable TV network. Below the primary interface a test interface connector was available, making it possible to connect test equipment without having to disconnect the main downstream signal from the network. The frequency of the downstream signal was configurable via the management interface.

A ComController needed at least one upstream receiver module. Each upstream receiver module offered two interfaces towards the HFC network.

To connect the cable modem network to the Internet, a ComController had one or more network modules. In the early models of the ComControllers, network modules offered two 10BASE-T interfaces. Each of these Ethernet interfaces could be linked to a VLAN within the Com21 network. After a while, the 10 Mbit Ethernet interfaces didn't offer sufficient bandwidth, as the offered speeds required faster network interconnection. The first successor was a network module with a fast Ethernet (100 Mbit/s) interface, but this interface lacked the option of VLANs.

As VLAN support was really needed to offer reliable services to the users of a cable modem network, the next version of the network controller was a single ATM interface offering an OC3 or STM-1 - 155 Mbit/s optical interface. In most configurations, a ComController used a single ATM network controller.

=== Cable modem ===
Com21 named their cable modems ComPort. Over the years, Com21 offered several models of their cable modems. All ComPort modems offered two interfaces: one coax connector to link to the TV network and an RJ-45 Ethernet interface. The early ComPort modems had also a module slot for a telephone module. The idea of this module slot was that a cable modem network would also offer a telephone service. These telephone modules never reached the market. Later (smaller) models of the ComPort modems didn't provide for a telephone module.

The early models of the modems also offered a hidden interface providing a 4-wire serial communication interface for debugging or monitoring purposes. Via a special connector a systems-engineer could connect this interface to the serial communications (RS-232) port of a PC to monitor the activity of a cable modem. With the help of a simple terminal emulator one could monitor the booting of the modem and then follow the process of finding a downstream signal, synchronizing the upstream channel and then registering to the ComController.

All proprietary ComPort modems could be used on the platform. Com21 developed early DOCSIS cable modems, obtaining DOCSIS 1.1 certification on Broadcom 3350 (DOXPort 1110) and 3345 (DOXPort 1110XB) designs.

=== DOXcontroller ===
Com21 also made a CMTS called the DOXcontroller 1000XB, which was OEMed by ARRIS (as the Cadant C3). Upon Com21's Chapter 7 bankruptcy, it was purchased by ARRIS, and was later DOCSIS 2.0 certified.

=== NMAPS ===
To manage a network with one or more ComControllers and all connected cable modems, Com21 offered their network management platform, called NMAPS. NMAPS was a proprietary platform using the HP OpenView platform. A typical feature of a Com21 network was that the cable modems didn't get an IP address. A modem was addressed using its MAC address. ComControllers were configured via NMAPS: setting the frequencies for the downstream and upstream signals, define VLANs and enabling the cable modems in one of the created VLANs. Via NMAPS the network managers could specify the speed of the modems, set filtering (e.g. only allowing a specific IP address that could be used behind that modem), etc. NMAPS was only available to run on a Sun server or workstation.

== Deployment ==
Before the worldwide acceptance of the DOCSIS standard, Com21 was highly successful in the industry. By 2000, Com21 had shipped over 500,000 modems and 1,000 ComControllers. The networks using the Com21 system passed 15 million households worldwide.

== Demise ==
On July 15, 2003, Com21 went out of business. The company filed for Chapter 11 bankruptcy and its DOCSIS cable modem assets were sold to ARRIS. At that time the company had 113 employees.
