= DOCSIS Set-top Gateway =

Communications technical specification

DOCSIS Set-top Gateway (or DSG) is a specification for the transmission of out-of-band data through a cable-television (CATV) system to set-top boxes. This is most commonly used to deliver program guides, channel lineups, and firmware updates.

DSG is an extension of the DOCSIS protocol governing cable modems, and applies to all versions of DOCSIS. Like DOCSIS, DSG was developed by CableLabs and contributing companies.

== Features ==
=== One-way operation ===
The original DOCSIS protocol supports only two way connectivity. A cable modem that is unable to acquire an upstream channel will give up and resume scanning for new channels. Likewise, persistent upstream errors will cause a cable modem to "reinitialize its MAC" and scan for new downstream channels. This behavior is appropriate for traditional cable modems, but not for cable set-top boxes. A cable set-top box still needs to acquire its out of band data even if the upstream channel is impaired.

The DSG specification introduced one way (downstream only) modes of operation. When upstream errors occur, the set-top enters a downstream-only state, periodically attempting to reacquire the upstream channel.

=== Defining how to recognize the correct downstream channel ===
Set-top out of band data is generally present only on certain downstream channels. The set-top needs a way to distinguish a valid downstream (containing the set-top's data) from an invalid one used only by standalone cable modems.

The DSG specification defines a special downstream keep-alive message so that the set-top can recognize an appropriate downstream channel.

=== Creating an out-of-band directory ===
The Advanced Mode of the DSG Specification introduces a special MAC Management message called the Downstream Channel Descriptor (DCD). The DCD provides a directory identifying the MAC and IP parameters associated with the out of band data streams.

Each data consumer is assigned a special Client Identifier that names the out of band data stream in the DCD.

=== SNMP MIBs ===
The DSG Specification creates two new SNMP management information bases (MIBs) to manage DSG devices. One MIB is used by the set-top, the other by the cable modem termination system (CMTS).

== See also ==
- Residential gateway
