= Zenith Cable Modem =

Proprietary cable modem

Zenith Cable Modem was one of the first proprietary cable modems. The two basic models are one operating at 500 kilobits per second (Kbit/s), and the other at four megabits per second (Mbit/s) with BPSK and approximately a 25% alpha.

== History ==
The Zenith Cable Modem was originally developed for a mid-split cable television network in the mid-1980s. It was used as an 8-bit full-height PC/AT-type card containing an Intel 80186 dedicated CPU, connected to an external white box about 2" x 12" x 6". Other similar products were made by Ungermann-Bass (UB) under the 10BROAD36 standard and Vital ink. UB had models supporting RS-232 and Ethernet outputs, as well as a re-modulating frequency translator.

In late 1993, Zenith Electronics and Prodigy provided 12 modified 500 Kbit "white modems" to Cox Communications in San Diego, including two with IBM Microchannel support. These modified modems were intended to support the Prodigy Cable Modem trial, which began on a 1500 homes-passed fiber node in El Cajon, CA. The modification allowed sub-split operation, with a fixed upstream frequency and a downstream at 74.75 MHz, within the 4 MHz space between analog channels four and five.

The initial trial consisted of a Prodigy server in the El Cajon headend, connected via the Microchannel-based cable modem to an Olsen Frequency Translator. This basic network supported the 1500 home passed fiber nodes, with six "subscribers" including one employee of Cox, who was also the head-end manager. One card was installed in rackmount PC in the Federal headend, another in the El Cajon headend. 1500 high pass filters were installed to eliminate any ingress from the drops. Service was reasonably reliable.

Zenith updated their white modems to a matte black case, adding the Homework name and marketing to cable operators at the $350 price range for 250 units. The new design used the same size external case, added LEDs to indicate power/TX/RX/activity and replaced the full sized 8-bit ISA card with a smaller 16-bit version. The new design dropped the onboard CPU. The modem connected to the card used a 15-pin D-shell connector—which exactly matched the PC's game connector. Both models were powered by the PC. The new modem was frequency agile, with a configuration utility that ran on the PC to set up US and DS frequencies. The option to configure the card's MAC address was soon dropped. However, the card's MAC address was not printed on the outside of the board, and thus was invisible once installed into the PC. Nor was the MAC address printed in a machine readable (bar code) format. Cox added these to the CM prior to installation, and tracked the subscriber to modem MAC address in an Excel spreadsheet, as the MAC address contained too many digits to fit into any fields within the customer billing system.

== Product versions ==
- White modem, from 1980s based design
- Black internal modem, Homework
- External modem, one Ethernet jack
- External modem, two Ethernet jacks
- HW revision A: first black case modem
- HW revision B: volume production of an estimated 750–1000 units for shipment to 8–10 cable operators
- HW revision C: introduced a two board model and 4" tall case that would allow use with a traditional Ethernet 10BASE-T connection instead of an internal PC card. The external models used an RJ-14 style phone jack for serial control, configuration, and management using a Zenith supplied utility application.
- HW revision D: eliminated the susceptibility to RF interference from nearby cell phones. The fault caused the transmit side phased locked loop (PLL) to fail. Resolution required a power cycle, fault was non-detectable in software other than no connectivity.
- HW revision E: introduced dual 10BaseT interface for University of California, San Diego, and other customers. Added modem MAC address to external CM, and in a bar code readable format.

All Zenith modems contained a small switch controlling the second coax port. The modem could either operate on one coax (built in diplex filter) or two (Headend use, dual plant networks, or external diplex filter.)

The initial Zenith "Headend" design was to use a residential cable modem inside a server, and a frequency translator to convert the upstream transmit frequency to the downstream receive frequency.

This design did not scale to more than a few networks, so the Channelizer was introduced—a 2.5" tall rack mountable device with separate US and DS RF ports, the diplex filter switch, and an Ethernet port.

The first large scale Zenith headend was constructed in Cox San Diego using Zenith's booth demonstration hardware from the 1994 Western Cable Show. Three Frequency Translators, plus four Channelizers were installed in El Cajon. These plus three other Channelizers were interconnected to an 8 port Cisco Catalyst 1200 Ethernet switch with single mode FDDI uplink for a 4 device, 140 km FDDI ring around San Diego county. The Prodigy server obtained a traditional Ethernet card.

The seven frequency translators plus seven Channelizers supported 65,000 homes passed on 23 fiber nodes, and occupied a full rack.

== Technology demonstration to initial deployment ==
Prodigy was deployed over cable modem to 200 users in time for the 1994 Western Cable Show. To grow the system from 16 users in three fiber nodes, to 200 required adding what became 64,000 homes passed, making the Cox San Diego–Prodigy cable modem field trial the world's largest cable modem deployment (by service area) at the time.

The acceptance criteria were too strict to achieve the 65% homes passed high speed internet penetration which is common today:

- Prodigy Subscriber greater than nine months
- Cable Subscriber
- Live in 2-way activated area
- Open slot in 80386 based PC or greater
- Willingness to participate, when called between December 15, 1994, and January 3, 1995

The result was a population of 1/4 of 1% of the homes passed, or 64,000 homes passed for 150 users.

At the time two-way communication over this service area was assumed reliable given that two-way Impulse Pay Per View cable boxes were deployed to these same places. The Pioneer Set Top Boxes used FSK, retransmitted up to 32 times over three days, and worked for up to five purchases without a return path.

== The Zenith MAC layer ==
CSMA/CD, or Ethernet "like" was expanded by reducing the data rate to 500 kbit/s for up to 50 (100?) miles plant radius and to 4 Mbit/s for up to 25 miles (40 km) plant radius. The transmitting device first listened for activity. If there was activity, it would activate the "A" LED, and wait. Activity is defined as any RF energy, intelligible or not, at an absolute amplitude of -25 dBmV into the device receive port within a 1 MHz or 6 MHz passband (500 kbit/s or 4 Mbit/s respectively.)

Upon detection of no activity, using appropriate back off timers (as per Ethernet CSMA/CD standard), the CM transmitted a preamble followed by the start of the Ethernet frame. Simultaneously, the transmitting CM would begin listening for its own burst. If the CM were able to decode its own burst, and correctly compare a checksum of the first 17 bytes of the packet, it would declare no-collision, and continue. If there was a checksum error, it would declare a collision, and stop transmitting after the 19th byte. This was easily and directly measured using Novell Analyzer software on a dedicated Windows 3.1 for Workgroups PC.

The card kept some locally accessible counters on excessive and late collisions, but there was no driver or management.

By November 20, 1996, Zenith released SNMP MIBs and management for their Channelizer under software release 9.32, under the title "Node Data Controller SNMP".

== Provisioning ==
The physical possession of a properly installed modem connected the subscriber to the network, and the use of this modem with a packet sniffer would enable full viewing of all transmitted and received packets from every user sharing that frequency translator.

Removing a device for non-payment required physically retrieving the device and preventing the availability of used or stolen modems. Modems could not be disabled remotely.

== Quality and reception ==
While not directly competing against an existing product, residential ISDN penetration was sub 0.1%, the technology had severe growing pains:

The team identified 19 Independent causes of two errors—CT-9 and CT-16, "A communications failure has occurred".

=== Driver–Software ===
- IPX driver not loaded when launching windows
- IDNX 56 kbit/s link from local Prodigy Server in El Cajon Headend to Yorktown, NY, was down
- Prodigy Server in El Cajon Headend experienced driver wedge due to excessive noise in return path, and inability to transmit packets, call Prodigy and request server reset
- Duplicate CM MAC address
- Lost modem frequency configuration
- Traffic Storm–ARP Storm, excessive traffic of any kind, or an ARP storm would shut down the network. Fastest resolution was often to take the network down and reboot the affected systems. (Often required calling the customer on the phone and asking them to do so.)

=== Modem hardware ===
- Cell phone used near the cable modem, PLL unlocked, power cycle to resolve
- Channelizer lock up, cell phone used near headend cable modem, PLL unlocked. Power Cycle to resolve
- Frequency translator drift, resolution: replace the Olsen unit with model made by Wavecom (now Vecima Networks, who now makes upconverters for the Cisco DOCSIS compliant CMTS platforms)
- Diplex filter switch got "bumped"
- Modem module disconnected or plugged into PC game port instead of modem card. (Less of an issue with black modem as LEDs would go dark, but impossible to verify on white modem without LEDs.)

=== RF ===
- LRC STS-75 end of line terminator causing Common Path Distortion (CPD) A mechanical design defect occurred when a 22-gauge piece of stainless steel wire was press fit into an aluminum housing and compressed to become "watertight." Unfortunately, corrosion developed anyway, and the resultant diode from dissimilar metals caused the CPD. Resolution: replace 10,000 units at $4/part + $25/labor with gold anodized model.
- Return path alignment and headend combining: Independently develop the "X-point" return path alignment and amplitude compensation process. Due to the Amplitude Modulation (AM) format of the return path FP lasers, a +25 DBMV CW tone injected at the fiber node status monitoring module would not arrive at the headend with constant amplitude. Pad inputs to frequency translator to ensure +5 dBmV input on this tone for each fiber node (individually).
- Filter Corp brick wall filter on the output path to the frequency translator was too sharp, introducing excessive group delay.
- PCS Cable Telephony trial precision CW clock distribution tone at 73.25 MHz jamming subscriber transmitters, causing "A" light on solid, and 100% collisions
- Poorly chosen upstream frequency for white modems, resolved for deployment of black modems.
- Too many homes passed per frequency translator. Worked reliably with 8500 to 10,000, but much better at about 6500 homes passed.
- Speaker modulation. When the coax connector on a nearby television set is loose, and the audio is really loud, the mechanical vibration of the television set alters the physical connection of the coax, allowing ingress and other interference.
- Missing return-path amplifier. During the early days of the trial, few repair trucks carried return-path capable–amplifiers. One amplifier was replaced with a one-way amplifier and improperly noted.

== RF requirements ==
Carrier/anything of at least 25 dB at the receive port of all modems. To support the time varying nature of an HFC network, 35 dB C/anything was required at the input to the frequency translator in the headend.

"Carrier/anything" includes: C/Noise, C/Interference and distortion products.

Downstream input to each cable modem of +5 dBmV ± 2 dB. Due to the non-existence of any real input AGC, the lack of a re-modulating frequency translator and lack of upstream transmit power control, the tight receive level range accommodated upstream path variation.

In comparison, a 2003 DOCSIS 2.0 compliant CMTS operating at 0.5 to 1 dB from theory provide both 16QAM and 64 QAM in 6.4 MHz at 25 dB C/noise, and in some cases negative C/I.

== RF plant maintenance in 1994–1995 ==
An HP 8590L (low cost version of 8591c), video out connected to a Caddo channel modulator operating above 550 MHz, with a Radio Shack black and white TV (picture tube) tuned to UHF channels to see the picture. Add to that a comb generator with 4–6 CW tones, an HP Callan 1776 "portable" spectrum analyzer. Not all amplifiers contained a good return-path test point, so the repair lab was asked to modify some line extender diplex filters to pass the forward, and divert the return path to an F connector. A pad socket was also converted. Any signal entering an amplifier with an amplitude above -45 dBmV was located and fixed. CLI was reduced to under 5 uV/m. Two years later, Milo Medan, CTO of @Home was reported to have said, "Please show me the fiber receivers that are connected to the outside plant, these don't have enough noise, so they are certainly not connected or properly aligned." Later, he was quoted as saying "Cox San Diego return plant is so clean you could eat off it." San Diego never had serious RF issues when it came to return path after 1995.

== Network Operations Center (NOC) ==
Modeled after the University of California, San Diego Telecommunications NOC at the Central Utilities Building, Novell Analyzer software w/ internal cable modem, and a technician to manually move the test connection between frequency translators. Only one frequency translator could be measured at a time. HP OpenView (HPOV) and a 24 port HP Advance Stack Ethernet HUB with AUI "uplink" was available. This combination allowed the Advance Stack hub to send out IPX diagnostic packets to the NDIS driver in each PC. Assuming the PC was running the driver at all times, the HP Open View application would display the NetWare device ID – 00000, mac-address as there was no real NetWare server–router. The management software would generate NDIS "diagnostic pings" from the hub, and report the number of successful responses. Rebooting the PC, loading and unloading the driver, or experiencing RF faults would cause each cable modem to transition from active to inactive hundreds of times per day.

HPOV could export the log file to a Paradox database for later analysis and trending. Eliminating the PC reloads and driver reloads from the RF faults, and correlating RF faults on a single frequency translator vs. the entire flat network was not available. These methods became the justification and fundamental research for what was later patented by others: US 6032019 and US 5943604. Eventually, this technique became mandatory in DOCSIS 3.0, although it was rejected and ignored for three years as a "proprietary extension to DOCSIS" by @Home and copied by every DOCSIS CMTS vendor.

By September 1994, the NOC was expanded with the introduction of two @ Cisco Catalyst 1200 Ethernet to FDDI switches, and two @ Cabletron MMAC-three FNB hubs (six Ethernet plus two FDDI), constructing a reliable path from the Federal Headend to the El Cajon headend, and eliminating one unreliable path between the Advance Stack hub and the various Channelizers and frequency translators.

== Videoconferencing over cable modems in 1994–1995 ==
CUs-SeeMe and Apple QuickTime Conferencing 1.0 beta ran over the Zenith and Lan city proprietary cable modems when the RF path was sufficiently clean. These modems were able to interoperate on the same RF fiber nodes using Frequency Division Multiplexing, using an Ethernet switch to join the otherwise incompatible networks.

Late in the beta, 160 x 120 pixel video was increased to 320 x 240, and the audio quality greatly improved on the Apple Power Macintosh 7100 AV.

== COGECO ==
Cogeco in Canada launched with the 4 Mbit/s, external Rev D cable modem in roughly 1996, and by August 1997 had 2500 subscribers. The network experienced failures for three reasons:

- The Zenith network is a pure bridged CSMA/CD Ethernet. It has no understanding of the Layer-3 ARP protocol. Thus ARP storms through the layer-2 switches used in the first headend designs would clog the network.
- The Layer-2 switches and Layer-3 routers of the time did not perform any QOS or rate limiting, thus a 4 Mbit/s input port on the Channelizer could be flooded with up to 10 Mbit/s of traffic bursts.
- The Cogeco network contained an unusual reverse path amplifier as part of the retrofit to accommodate return path. This amplifier contained a design defect whereby the pad and equalizer plug-in modules would literally fall off the circuit board when the device was opened. A thermal incompatibility existed causing the holes for the parts to increase in diameter, while the pins would elongate and become smaller. This fault was documented and proven as a result of Cogeco's first DOCSIS deployment with the Cisco uBR7246, MC11-FPGA line card, and IOS 11.3(4)NA, which contained the "flap list."
