= Rouzbeh Yassini =

American engineer

- روزبه یاسینی
- Born: Rouzbeh Yassini-Fard; Tehran, Iran
- Education: West Virginia University
- Occupations: Engineer, technology executive, author
- Years active: 1981–present
- Known for: Early development of the cable modem; DOCSIS standards
- Awards: WVU Distinguished Alumni Inductee (2013); Honorary doctorate, WVU (2003)
- Website: planetbroadband.com

Rouzbeh Yassini (Persian: روزبه یاسینی) is an American engineer who is known within the broadband communications industry as "the father of the cable modem" for being the founder of LANCity, the first company to deliver a practical device. He also helped establish cable modem industry standards (DOCSIS) through his work with Cable Television Laboratories (CableLabs). Yassini is executive director of the University of New Hampshire Broadband Center Of Excellence, founder and board member of the YAS Foundation, and is the author of several books.

== Early life and education ==
Yassini was born in Tehran, Iran and attended the University of Pahlavi for one year before immigrating to the United States in 1977. He earned a Bachelor of Science degree in Electrical Engineering from West Virginia University in 1981.

== Career ==
After graduating, Yassini worked for General Electric, working on television and communications technology. In 1986 he moved to Proteon, a data networking company. In 1988 he joined Applitek, another data networking company, as the vice president of engineering.

In 1990, he acquired Applitek's assets and founded LANcity, directing the 13 employees who stayed on to condense 64 product variants into one single device which interfaced between a local Ethernet network and the outside cable TV network. To fund development, Yassini formed a deal with computing giant Digital Equipment Corporation (DEC), offering product discounts and branding rights in exchange for cash and technology approval. LANcity's first offering cost between $15,000 and $18,000, was as large as a typical desktop computer, and took three months to install. The company's second model began shipping in 1993 for $5,000, and was smaller, more reliable, and easier to install. The third-generation "plug-and-play" devices sold for $500, and by 1995 the company's products accounted for 80% of the market. Later that year, the large telecommunications company Motorola announced its intentions to enter the still nascent industry, casting into doubt LANCity's ability to compete. In 1996, Yassini accepted a $59 million buyout deal from Bay Networks at the urging of his employees. Yassini said he chose the deal over other companies making higher offers because he thought Bay's CEO shared his vision for the technology. However, three months later, Bay brought in new leadership which Yassini said marginalized his strategic development role, and prompted him to quit the company.

Yassini then joined CableLabs as a consultant, where he contributed to the development of DOCSIS, a standard for transmitting data over cable television systems. At CableLabs, Yassini coordinated with manufacturers and operators of cable equipment and helped lead the organization's certification testing project. DOCSIS was later adopted as an interoperability standard through the Society of Cable Telecommunications Engineers (SCTE) and the International Telecommunication Union (ITU).

In the same period, Yassini established YAS Corporation, a Boston-based consulting and investment firm focused on broadband technologies.

In 2008, he opened the Yassini Broadband Knowledge Center in Boston to support broadband research and technology demonstration. In 2013, its activities were transferred to the University of New Hampshire, where Yassini became executive director of the newly formed UNH Broadband Center for Excellence (UNHBCoE). The center focused on broadband expansion and interoperability research.

== Selected awards and achievements ==
- 2019: Inducted to Light Reading Hall of Fame class of 2019
- 2013: Inducted to WVU Distinguished Alumni class of 2013.
- 2003: Honorary Ph.D. from West Virginia University
- 2000: Inducted as member of WVU Lane Department of Academy

== Publications ==
- Rouzbeh Yassini-Fard Accidental Network, (WVU Press, 2025), ISBN 978-1959000600
- Rouzbeh Yassini, Planet Broadband, (Cisco Press, 2004), ISBN 978-1587200908
- Rouzbeh Yassini, Internet Of People: The Future Of Broadband, Broadband Library, Winter 2014
- Rouzbeh Yassini, Television White Spaces: Assessing TVWS for Rural Broadband Access, UNHBCoE, November 2014
- Rouzbeh Yassini, Broadband 2030: The Networked Future, Broadband Intelligent Series, UNHBCoE, December 2013
- Rouzbeh Yassini, Broadband 2020: Achieving Ubiquity, Broadband Intelligent Series, UNHBCoE, November 2013
