= Cohere Technologies =

Telecoms software company

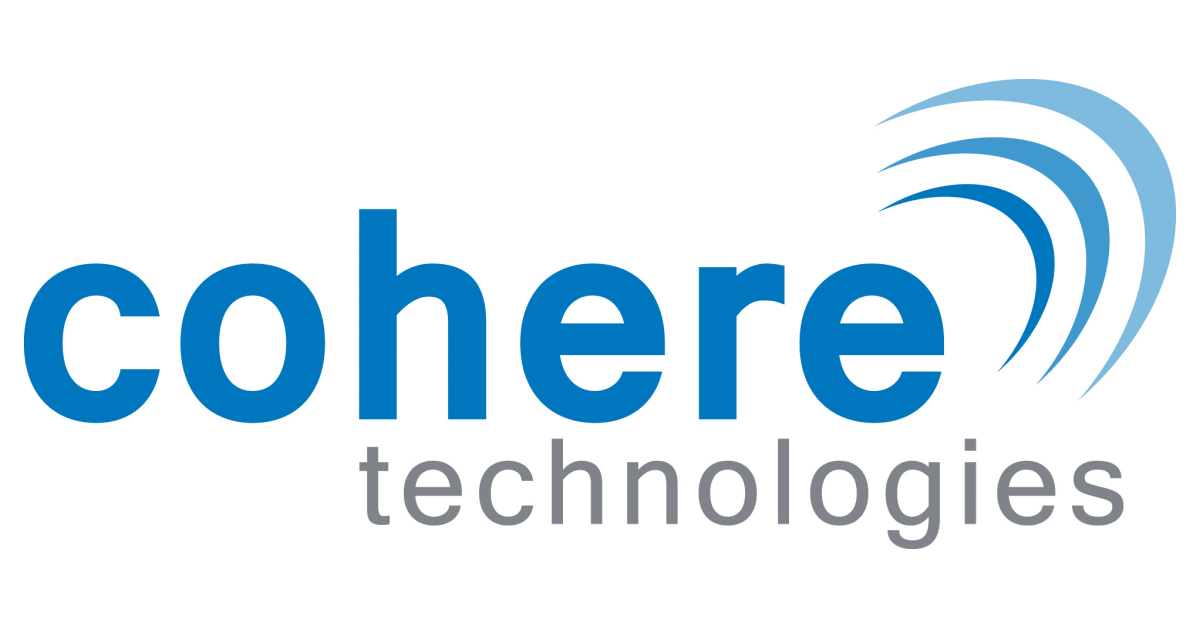
- Type: Private
- Industry: Telecoms, Technology
- Founded: 2011
- Founder: Ronny Hadani, Shlomo Rakib
- Headquarters: San Jose, California, United States
- Website: https://www.cohere-tech.com

Cohere Technologies is a telecommunications software company based in San Jose, California that develops technology for boosting the network performance of 4G and 5G spectrum in wireless networks. Founded in 2011, Cohere holds the patents for the Orthogonal Time Frequency Space (OTFS) 2D modulation technique used to improve the performance of 4G and 5G networks and is being considered as a waveformand develops the Universal Spectrum Multiplier (USM) software for enhancing spectral efficiency in mobile networks.

Cohere is the creator of Pulsone Technology, a product family focused on Integrated Sensing and Communications (ISAC) networks and Non-Terrestrial Networks (NTN), based on the Zak-OTFS waveform.

== History ==
Cohere Technologies was founded in 2011 by Shlomo Rakib, a serial entrepreneur, and Ronny Hadani, an associate professor of mathematics at the University of Texas, Austin. The pair patented the OTFS waveform in 2010.The company initially focused on developing OTFS modulation technology, a two-dimensional representation of the wireless channel designed to provide stable wireless service under various channel conditions.

Raymond Dolan, co-founder of Flarion Technologies (acquired by Qualcomm in 2006), joined Cohere Technologies as the company's chairman and CEO in October 2018.

Cohere Technologies' first trials of OFTS with a carrier took place at Telefónica in 2018.

In 2018, the company changed its focus to the use of Delay-Doppler-based channel detection, estimation and prediction, as well as precoding software to improve 4G and 5G wireless systems with its Universal Spectrum Multiplier software.

In 2020, Cohere Technologies won a GSMA GLOMO award for "Best Network Software Breakthrough," and was also shortlisted for the award in 2023.In 2026, Cohere Technologies won a GSMA GLOMO award for "Best Mobile Technology Breakthrough.

In February 2023, Cohere announced a collaboration with Mavenir to support the transition to Open RAN technology.

In April 2023, the company co-announced the Multi-G O-RAN initiative with Intel, Juniper Networks, Mavenir, and VMware, supported by carriers including Vodafone, Telstra, and Bell Canada.

On October 20, 2025, Cohere launched Pulsone Technology as a distinct product family targeting ISAC and NTN applications. The technology is based on the Zak-OTFS waveform.

In March 2026, Cohere Technologies joined the OCUDU Ecosystem Foundation, a Linux Foundation initiative to accelerate open source AI-RAN innovation.The Open Centralized Unit Distributed Unit (OCUDU) initiative was formed with the goal of creating an open and multi-vendor software-driven ecosystem.

Cohere currently holds more than 300 patents relating to 4G, 5G, and OTFS.

Co-founder Shlomo Rakib currently serves as Cohere's CTO.

== Products ==
=== Universal Spectrum Multiplier (USM) ===
Announced in 2021, Cohere's Universal Spectrum Multiplier (USM) software is designed to boost the performance of 4G and 5G FDD or TDD networks and can be integrated by network equipment suppliers in the radio access network (RAN) or as an xApp/RIC in the telco cloud. This technology has been tested by mobile operators such as Vodafone, Deutsche Telekom, and Telstra.

USM operates as a wireless optimization system built on Delay-Doppler channel modeling, using cloud-based architecture to enable function disaggregation and multi-site network visibility.The system integrates with base station layers to enable FDD MU-MIMO scheduling and beamforming capabilities driven by machine learning.

=== Pulsone Technology ===
Pulsone Technology, launched in October 2025, is based on the Zak-OTFS waveform and operates in the delay-Doppler domain rather than the time-frequency domain used by OFDM systems. The product family targets three primary application areas: Integrated Sensing and Communications (ISAC) for defense and enterprise applications, Non-Terrestrial Networks (NTN) for satellite communications, and 6G network development.

Pulsone family includes a real-time neural receiver developed in collaboration with Duke University and Virginia Tech, demonstrated on NVIDIA's Jetson platform at the GTC government conference in October 2025.

=== Dynamic Network Alignment (DNA) ===
Cohere also announced the Dynamic Network Alignment (DNA) tool in 2023, which is an automated MU-MIMO beamforming solution for calibrating 4G and 5G networks using existing network and spectrum assets.

In February 2024, Cohere and Vodafone announced completion of successful field testing of USM software in Vodafone's 5G network in Ciudad Real, Spain. The trial followed earlier lab demonstrations conducted in 2021.

In February 2025, Cohere and Bell Canada announced completion of field testing in a brownfield deployment environment.The trial took place in December 2024 and January 2025 near Bell's technology labs in Mississauga, Ontario, in the greater Toronto metropolitan area. Testing was conducted using Bell's 850 MHz spectrum band (FDD) on the 5G standalone network.

Cohere's USM software, located on a server next to the gNodeB, conducted coordinated scheduling with a third-party base station to enable MU-MIMO capacity improvements.

=== ECHO ===
Announced in 2026, ECHO (Enhanced Channel Insight with Holographic Observability) is a USM feature that captures data from real time operations in the USM to be used for real-time wireless channel functions and analysis.The ECHO data stream can enable new network capabilities in existing 5G networks such as Integrated Sensing and Communications (ISAC) for consumers and national defense, Digital Twin Networks, and improved network resilience and performance.For ISAC specifically, ECHO can improve bi-/multi-static sensing on 5G base stations.For Digital Twin Networks, ECHO feeds them geometry-rich data from the physical radio environment, instead of aggregated statistics.

ECHO’s dataset is intended to support AI-based layered inference, where telemetry data collected at the site level is analyzed to generate insights and operational adjustments across network layers.The system continuously incorporates network changes into AI training models, supporting adaptive scheduling, beam management, and coordination among multiple base stations in borderless cell environments.

== See also ==
- Orthogonal Time Frequency Space (OTFS)
- Open RAN
- 5G
- Integrated Sensing and Communications (ISAC)
