= Raymond Dolan =

Raymond Dolan may refer to:

- Raymond Joseph Dolan (born 1954), Irish neuroscientist
- Raymond Paul Dolan (born 1957), American engineer

== See also ==
- Ray Dolan, Irish singer-songwriter and guitarist
