= Littoinen =

Coordinates: 60°26′N 022°24′E

Littoinen Littois
- Village
- Location within Southwest Finland Location within Finland

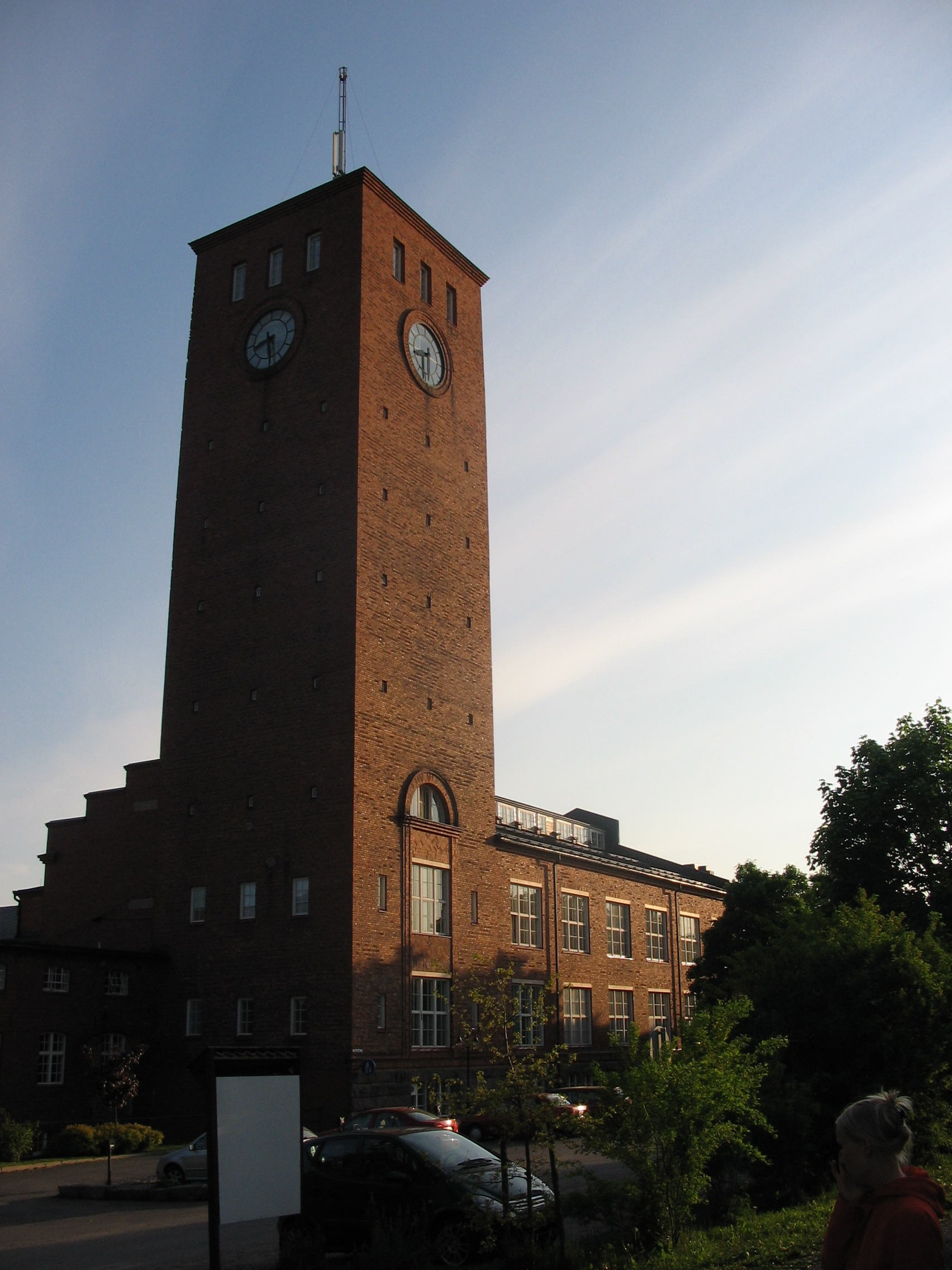
Littoinen broadcloth factory

Littoinen (Finnish; Littois in Swedish) is a village in south-western Finland, centred on Lake Littoinen (Finnish: Littoistenjärvi, Swedish: Littois träsk). The village is shared between the town of Kaarina and the municipality of Lieto, and it borders the regional centre of Turku. It started growing after the founding of a broadcloth factory by Lake Littoinen in 1739, and the railway connection built in 1899 increased its growth. In the 1960s the operations of the broadcloth factory (Finnish: verkatehdas) were discontinued due to decreased demand, but the premises still exist and have been transformed into residential and commercial spaces. The factory's heritage is still visible in the village's place and street names.

== History ==
The origin of the town dates back to 1739 when merchants Henric Rungeen and Esaias Wechter were granted authorization to establish a textile factory on the shores of Lake Littoistenjärvi. This textile industry thrived in Littoinen until 1969, when the factory operations were relocated to the Raunistula district of Turku.

Littoinen obtained its own railway station along the Helsinki-Turku railway line in 1899.

In 1965, Huonekalutehdas Korhonen moved part of its product manufacturing to Littoisen in Kaarina on the border of Turku. In 1982, after the third construction phase of the factory, the production of furniture products moved entirely to Littoisen, where Artek now manufactures furniture, small chairs, armchairs and tables designed by Alvar Aalto. The furniture factory Korhonen was acquired by Artek in 2014 and Artek established a new company called A-Factory for production.

In recent years, Teleste, a company specializing in antenna equipment and central radio devices, relocated its headquarters and factory to Littoinen, near the Turku border.
