= Richard Green (telecommunication) =

Dr. Richard R. “Dick” Green is best known for his work heading up Cable Television Laboratories (CableLabs), the research arm of the cable industry, and for his work with international television standards organizations. After a more than 50-year career in telecommunications and television Green was honored with a Prime Time Emmy for lifetime achievement from the National Academy of Television Arts and Sciences, and was inducted into the Cable Hall of Fame.

== Career ==
Green was President and CEO of CableLabs from 1988 through 2009. He guided the cable industry through the transition from its analog roots to the broadband architectures of today, stressing interoperability and standardization across a broad range of operators and suppliers. Under Green’s leadership, CableLabs managed key technology developments that helped the cable industry expand services to include broadband internet service and telephony. The development of the Data over Cable Services Interface Specification (DOCSIS) has resulted in cable’s dominance of the broadband internet market in North America and the retail availability of high-speed cable modems. DOCSIS is an interoperability specification that ensures cable modems from various manufacturers will function correctly on networks run by the different cable operators, and allows manufacturers to produce at scale. The first DOCSIS 1.0 cable modems were certified by CableLabs in 1999.

Prior to CableLabs, Green held the position of senior vice president of Broadcast Operations and Engineering at the Public Broadcasting Service (PBS) where his contributions included construction of national network origination and transmission facilities. He was instrumental in establishing Public Broadcasting as a leader in high definition television and digital audio transmission technology. From 1980 to 1983, Green was director of the CBS Advanced Television Technology Laboratory in Stamford, Conn. Green served as Director of Engineering at Time Fiber Communication from 1979-1980.

From 1977 to 1979, Dr. Green managed ABC’s Video Tape Post Production Department in Hollywood, and from 1972 to 1977, he directed basic research in laser technology for the Hughes Aircraft Co. in Los Angeles. Green served as a senior staff scientist for Boeing Scientific Research Laboratories (1964-1972), and as an assistant professor at the University of Washington (1968-1972).

Currently Green serves as a director of Liberty Global Corporation, Liberty Broadband Corporation and GCI Liberty. He is on the advisory board of the Nyagi Project. Green is former Chair of The Space Science Institute in Boulder Colorado.

== Television standards ==
Prior to his role at PBS, Green helped organize and establish the Advanced Television Systems Committee (ATSC), a multi-industry-supported organization founded to develop voluntary national standards for advanced television. He held the position of Executive Director of that organization until 1983. Green served as Chair of the International Telecommunication Union committee that produced CCIR (now ITU-R) Recommendation 601, a world- wide television standard for digital signals. He is the former Chair of SG9, a United Nations signatory committee (ITU-T) charged with the responsibility of recommending worldwide standards for advanced television services.

== Honors and awards ==
- Charles F. Jenkins Lifetime Achievement Award, National Academy of Television Arts and Sciences, 2012. The Jenkins Award honors a living individual whose ongoing contributions have significantly affected the state of television technology and engineering.
- Cable Hall of Fame, Cable Center, 2008.
- Technical Leadership Award, Broadcasting and Cable Magazine, 2001.
- Cable Television Pioneer, 2001
- Vanguard Award for Science and Technology, National Cable Telecommunications Association, 1999, for DOCSIS
- Louis T. Bezenet Award, Colorado College, 1999
- CED Magazine Man of the Year, 1991

== Education ==
Green holds a B.S. degree from Colorado College (1959), a M.S. in physics from the State University of New York in Albany (1964), and a Ph.D. from the University of Washington (1968). He was born June 10, 1937, in Colorado Springs, Colorado.

== Publications ==
Engineering publications:

- M. Mirachi, and R. Green. "Military Laser Range Finding--A Status Report." IEEE Journal of Quantum Electronics 5.6 (1969): 327.
- Richard, Green R., and Morass F. Dwight. "Production Experience in High Definition Television." Society of Motion Picture and Television Engineers, Journal (1984): 169–74.
- Richard R. Green, “CableLabs: A History of the First 10 Years.” Multichannel News, June 8, 1988, p. 65. [mostly about the founding]
- Richard R. Green. Future Challenges for Cable Television. Donald W. Levenson Memorial Lecture in Cable Engineering. [University Park, Pa.]: National Cable Television Center and Museum in Association with College of Engineering, the Pennsylvania State University, 1990.
- Richard R. Green. "Cable Television Technology Development" in National Research Council, The Unpredictable Certainty: Information Infrastructure Through 2000, White Papers. Washington, DC: The National Academies Press, 1997, p. 256-270.
- Dick Green, “The Human Equation: Cable’s Technology Achievements Flow from Gusto for Collaboration.” Multichannel News, Nov. 8, 2010, p. 39

Astrophysics publications:

- "An Analysis of Distribution of the Thermal Anomalies on Eclipsed Moon." Transactions-American Geophysical Union 49 (2):520 (1968)
- An Analysis of the Distribution of the Major Surface Characteristics and the Thermal Anomalies Observed on the Eclipsed Moon. Seattle: Boeing Scientific Research Laboratories, Geo-Astrophysics Laboratory, 1969.
- "A Stochastic Model of Distribution of Lunar Thermal Anomalies." & "Relative Dating of the Lunar Surface". Transactions-American Geophysical Union 50(2):61 (1969)
- Luciano B. Ronca and Richard R. Green. "Large-scale Evolution of the Lunar Surface."Astrophysics and Space Science 3.4 (1969): 564-78.
- L. B. Ronca and R. R. Green. "Aeolian Regime of the Surface of Venus." Astrophysics and Space Science 8.1 (1970): 59–65.
- Ronca, L. B., and R. R. Green. "Statistical Geomorphology of the Lunar Surface." Geological Society of America Bulletin 81.2 (1970): 337.
