= Raymond Paul Dolan =

Mechanical engineer, executive

- Born: September 15, 1957 (age 69); United States
- Education: United States Naval Academy (B.S.); Columbia University (M.B.A.)
- Occupations: Executive, mechanical engineer, United States Marine Corps pilot
- Known for: CDMA IS-95A and Flash-OFDM

Raymond "Ray" Paul Dolan (born September 15, 1957) is an American mechanical engineer, executive, and former United States Marine Corps pilot notable for his involvement in the development of the CDMA-based digital cellular technology known as IS-95A. Dolan also oversaw the development of the signal processing technology Flash-OFDM. He co-founded Flarion Technologies, which was acquired by Qualcomm, and currently leads Cohere Technologies.

U.S. President Barack Obama appointed Dolan to the National Security Telecommunications Advisory Committee in 2016. Currently, he still holds this position (see National Communications System).

== Education ==
Dolan graduated with a bachelor's degree in mechanical engineering from the U.S. Naval Academy. He was a member of the Naval Academy's rowing team, the Navy Crew. He also earned an M.B.A. from the Columbia University School of Business.

== Career ==
Dolan served in the U.S. Marine Corps as a tactical jet pilot for more than seven years before being honorably discharged in 1986.

He became a field engineer at PacTel Cellular in 1986, eventually becoming Manager of Network Operations before leaving the company.

=== CDMA IS-95A ===
From 1988 to 1996, Dolan served in numerous roles at Bell Atlantic/NYNEX Mobile, which would eventually become Verizon. As Director of Technologies, he was involved in the development of the CDMA-based digital cellular technology known as IS-95A.

After leaving Bell Atlantic/NYNEX Mobile, Dolan served as COO of NextWave Telecom from 1996 to 2000. In 2003, Dolan was appointed to the board of directors of American Tower, a position that he still holds today.

=== Flash-OFDM ===
After NextWave, Dolan co-founded Flarion Technologies in 2000. At Flarion, Dolan oversaw the development of the signal processing technology Flash-OFDM. Dolan became chairman and CEO of Flarion Technologies up until its acquisition by Qualcomm in 2006, which formed Qualcomm Flarion Technologies. Dolan also served as CEO of Qualcomm Flarion Technologies and eventually became Senior Vice President of Qualcomm Inc.

=== Other work ===
In 2008, Dolan was appointed to the board of directors of Nii Holdings, a position which he held until 2012. He was also appointed the president, CEO, and a board member of Sonus Networks in 2010. Dolan joined Cohere Technologies as the company's Chairman in early 2018, and later that year as the company's CEO.

=== Appointments by President Barack Obama ===
In 2016, U.S. President Barack Obama appointed Dolan to the National Security Telecommunications Advisory Committee.
