= BigBand Networks =

American media corporation, 1999–2011

- Company type: Private
- Industry: Digital Video; CMTS
- Founded: 1999, public 2007
- Headquarters: Redwood City, California, United States
- Key people: Amir Bassan-Eskenazi, President & Co-Founder, Former CEO; Ran Oz, Co-Founder & Former CTO
- Revenue: ▲US$112M (FY 2010)
- Operating income: ▼US$-30.8M (FY 2010)
- Net income: ▼US$-31.6M (FY 2010)
- Total assets: ▼US$181M (FY 2010)
- Total equity: ▼US$134M (FY 2010)
- Number of employees: 620 (July 2007)
- Parent: Arris Group
- Website: bigbandnet.com

BigBand Networks was a corporation headquartered in Redwood City, California, that opened in 1999 and specialized in selling multimedia technologies to cable television multi-system operators. It had its IPO on the Nasdaq in 2007, which was met with controversy when a class-action lawsuit alleged that the company violated the Securities Act of 1933. The company was acquired as a division within Arris Group in 2011.

BigBand manufactured and sold digital video and data processing products and services for digital video and cable modem termination systems (CMTS). During its existence, BigBand won two Emmy Awards for its video on demand service and switched video technology.

== Description ==
BigBand's development centers were assimilated by Arris Group. The main video products are developed in Tel Aviv, Israel employing roughly 200 people. The main data and voice products development center is in Westborough, Massachusetts with roughly 175 people. A third research and development office is located in Shenzhen, China.

The company formerly sold video, voice, and data products directly to major cable multi-system operators (MSOs). Amongst the company's biggest MSO clients were Comcast, Time Warner Cable, Cablevision, Cox with Verizon becoming their biggest customer in 2006.

BigBand's main products include a digital video processing platform called BMR and a cable modem termination system (CMTS) called Cuda. The video platform enables services such as switched video, digital cable, video on demand and IPTV offered on a variety of transport networks such as QAM cable, DSL and Verizon Fios.

BigBand won two Emmy Awards, one for service in the US with Time Warner Cable "Start Over", enabling video on demand, the ability to pause a broadcast program and watch it later. In 2008, BigBand received the Technology and Engineering Emmy Award for its switched video technology which enabled cable operators to deliver unlimited number of broadcast channels to their subscribers.

== History ==
=== 2007 IPO and class action lawsuit ===
BigBand went public in March 2007. The offering was underwritten by Morgan Stanley, Merrill Lynch, Jeffries & Company, Cowen & Company and ThinkEquity.

In October 2007, a class-action shareholder lawsuit was filed on behalf of shareholders who purchased BigBand Network securities in the company's IPO on March 15, 2007. The lawsuit sought to pursue remedies under the Securities Act of 1933. The complaint alleged BigBand violated the Securities Act, and that company insiders including the CEO, CFO and CTO knowingly published misleading and false statements about the company's financial health and product offerings. In particular, the complaint alleged that BigBand materially misstated their revenues, and engaged, among other allegations, in the practice informally known as channel stuffing to artificially inflate their financials prior to IPO. The suit was settled in 2009, with BigBand agreeing to pay US$1.5 million.

In 2007, BigBand sued a firm started by ex-employees. The firm, called Imagine Communications, was allegedly infringing on 3 of BigBand's patents covering video processing and bandwidth management techniques.

=== Acquisition by Arris Group ===
In 2011 the acquisition of BigBand by Arris Group was completed for $172 million, with Arris paying $53 million for the acquisition of BigBand's outstanding shares.

== Publications ==
- Network Design for a Multiplicity of Services (2003)
- The Triple-Play Network Platform (2004)
- The Statistics of Switched Broadcast (2005)
- Advanced Monitoring of Switched Broadcast Systems (2007)
