= Phil McKinney =

American businessman

Phil McKinney is an American businessman who is CEO of CableLabs. McKinney was CTO of Hewlett-Packard's Personal Systems Group. He is an author and hosts a podcast.

== Career ==
McKinney became product development manager for the software division at Prentice Hall publishing in 1982. Later he became director of product development for ThumbScan in 1988. ThumbScan was a key based device that allowed only authorized users to log into encrypted data on a computer. In 1990, McKinney became president of Tereplex. He led the Tereplex agreement with Atmel to license the Minimum Instruction Set Computer (MISC) technology. From 1991 until 1996 he was a senior executive for the Communication Industry consulting practice at Computer Sciences. In 1997, McKinney went to work at Teligent. While at Teligent, McKinney served as senior vice president and CIO.

He became CTO for Network and Server Provider Business division of Hewlett-Packard (HP) in 2002. McKinney served as CTO of HP's Personal Systems Group from 2005 until 2011. While at HP, he founded the Innovation Program Office which focused on fostering new technologies, products and services for HP. His Innovation Program Office (IPO) team created products and technologies including Blackbird, a high-end gaming PC, Firebird, a gaming PC using laptop technology. IPO created Envy 133, a laptop made with carbon fiber which was the thinnest laptop at the time of its release which won a best of category award from I.D.'s annual design review in 2009. The team also created Gabble, a private video sharing platform, Twynergy, which identifies user interests on Twitter and has the ability to compare users, Pluribus, a 3D display technology, Vantage TouchWall, an interactive wall display, and DreamScreen, a touch screen all in one device that was marketed in India. These innovations earned HP a spot on Fast Company's list of the world's 50 most innovative companies three years in a row.

In March 2010, McKinney joined the board of trustees of the Computer History Museum. He authored the book Beyond the Obvious: Killer Questions That Spark Game-Changing Innovation published by Hyperion in February 2012. In June 2012, McKinney became president and CEO of CableLabs, a non-profit cable industry research and innovation lab based in Louisville, Colorado.

== Other work ==
McKinney founded and hosts a podcast named Killer Innovations. He is a contributing columnist for the Forbes column “The Objective.” His board memberships include the advisory board for Hacking Autism and The Computer History Museum. In 2011, he wrote an article about the “7 Immutable Laws of Innovation.”

== Personal life ==
McKinney was born in Cincinnati. He is an Eagle Scout in Boy Scouts. McKinney lives with his wife in Colorado and has three children.
