= Esaias Wechter =

- Born: 1701; Turku, Sweden
- Died: 17 May 1776; Turku, Sweden
- Occupations: merchant, industrialist
- Spouses: Catharina née Schele; Catharina Elisabeth née Danckwardt
- Children: Vendla; Hans Henric (ca. 1728–1788); Esaias (1729–1794); Catharina Elisabeth, married Idman (1732–1797); Israel (1736–1764); Margareta Elisabeth (1737–1739); Jeremias (born 1740); Johan Joachim (1748–1749); Daniel (1749–1749); Brita Johanna, married Bäck (1751–1824); Maria Magdalena, married Lander (born 1754); Benjamin (born 1759)
- Parent(s): Henric Wechter and Anna née Simolenia

Esaias Wechter (1701 – 17 May 1776) was a Finnish merchant (living in what was then Sweden), early industrialist and politician.

Wechter started the first baize manufactory of Turku and was co-founder of the local shipbuilding industry together with his business partner Henric Rungeen. Wechter became one of the richest merchants of the city.

Wechter took part in the Diet of Sweden for three times in 1734–1743 representing the estate of bourgeoisie. He was also involved in local politics starting from the 1730s; between 1741 and 1769 he was a councillor. For the end of his political career Wechter was passive and embittered. In time, he also lost most of his property.

== Early years ==
Wechter was born in Turku, Southwest Finland. His parents were merchant, mayor Henric Wechter and Anna née Simolenia. The Wechters were an old Turku bourgeois family. The city fell under Russian occupation during the great wrath in 1713 and the family could not escape. Henric Wechter hid a part of his large property and could not manage to tell the location of the treasure before his death. The cache was found at an academy construction site in 1802, when Esaias Wechter had already died.

== Industrial career ==
Soon after the end of the Great Northern War in 1723 Esaias Wechter received bourgeois rights. He became shipowner and participated in foreign trade. Although Turku was a poor city back then, Wechter's business ran well. In 1726 he married Catharina Schele, which further advanced his financial situation. In 1730 he was the second richest bourgeois of Turku after Henric Rungeen. In the 1730s Wechter was involved in developing many industrial companies.

In 1732 Wechter and Rungeen founded a small shipyard to east side of River Aura, next to Korppolaismäki. At first the yard repaired ships of the local merchants. Shipbuilding began in 1737, and the owners recruited English-born master shipbuilder Robert Fithie to lead the operations. The yard built at least three large ships during 1738–1741. This was the beginning of industrial shipbuilding in Turku and led later to development of Turku Old Shipyard.

In 1738 Wechter and few other bourgeois rented the Teijo iron mill.

Wechter and Rungeen founded a baize manufactory in Turku in 1738. They applied for privileges, and in 1739 they were awarded a ten-year-long exclusive right to baize production, and a certain part of the production was sold to military stationed in Finland. The co-operation with Rungeen ended in the same year due to political dissensions and Wechter owned the manufactory alone thereafter. The production started first in temporary facilities and was moved in 1742 to two complexes on west side of Aura river. The machinery consisted of four looms. A fulling facility was built at a mill in Littoinen and the cloth was dyed in another facility owned by Wechter. Soon the number of personnel reached 60.

The bottleneck in production was the availability of yarn. A new facility for yarn spinning was started in a new penitentiary founded in 1738. Wechter was the facility manager in 1738–1750. The employees were some dozen women who were vagrants or convicted for crimes. The conditions of the workers were inhumane; one week's amount of food was enough for just two days and the women suffered of coldness and maltreatment by guards. Reportedly, three women killed their infants to get a death penalty. Due to the extremely poor conditions productivity remained low, frustrating Wechter.

When Sweden went to war against Russia and the Russian troops advanced towards Turku in 1743, Wechter dismounted the looms, brought them to Stockholm and continued the operations in temporary facilities. The shipyard was closed shortly before arrival of the Russian army; the last ship produced transported refugees to Stockholm. Wechter transported the machinery back to Turku after the war and Russian withdrawal. The business ran well and the company got its first competitor as late as in 1756. But Wechter had funded the business by beneficial public loans, which he eventually could not pay back. The situation was further worsened during the recession in the 1760s. Due to financial problems caused by the manufactory and other businesses, Wechter had to sell the operations to Joseph Bremer in 1770.

== Political career ==
=== Diet of Sweden ===
Wechter was selected to represent the bourgeoisie in the Swedish Diet for the first time in 1734. He got directly into the political core, as he was set to the Secret Committee. In the committee Wechter supported the Caps' party and Arvid Horn. He was selected for the second time to the Diet and Secret Committee in 1738–1739. In the committee he resisted the plan of the Hats to start a war against Russia. He also participated in discussions about requirement of Finnish language knowledge for officials serving in Finland.

Supporters of Wechter wanted to send him to the Diet of 1740, but the governor denied the plan. Wechter participated in the 1742 Diet during his exile in Stockholm. He attempted to participate in the 1746 Diet but lost the elections. The craftsmen of Turku selected Wechter to represent them in the Diet but his attorney letter was denied in Stockholm.

=== Local politics ===
Wechter was a difficult person to get along with; he was eager to criticise others and his property decreased over time. One reason for this was his large family. He lost his supporters among bourgeois during the 1740s but garnered popularity among craftsmen.

Since the 1730s Wechter was the chairman of the city elders and in 1741 he became councillor. In 1745 he sought the mayor position, but lost against Anders Roos. Wechter could not swallow his defeat. Following the election, he neglected his role as councillor, but continued to hold the post until 1769.
