= 10BROAD36 =

Obsolete Ethernet standard

10BROAD36 is an obsolete computer network standard in the Ethernet family. It was developed during the 1980s and specified in IEEE 802.3b-1985. The Institute of Electrical and Electronics Engineers standards committee IEEE 802 published the standard, ratified in 1985, as an additional section, 11, to the base Ethernet standard. It was also issued as ISO/IEC 8802-3 in 1989.

The standard supports 10 Mbit/s Ethernet signals over standard 75 ohm cable television (CATV) cable over a 3600-meter range. 10BROAD36 modulates its data onto a higher-frequency carrier signal, much as an audio signal would modulate a carrier signal to be transmitted by a radio station. In telecommunications engineering, this is a broadband signaling technique. (Note: The term broadband has since been applied to describe high-speed Internet access, a different topic.) Broadband provides several advantages over the baseband signal used, for instance, in 10BASE5. Range is greatly extended, to 3,600 m (11,800 ft), versus 500 m (1,600 ft) for 10BASE5, and multiple signals can be carried on the same cable. 10BROAD36 can even share a cable with standard television channels.

== Deployment ==
10BROAD36 was less successful than its contemporaries because of the high equipment complexity (and cost) associated with it. The individual stations are much more expensive due to the extra radio frequency circuitry involved; however the primary extra complexity comes from the fact that 10BROAD36 is unidirectional. Signals can only travel one direction along the line, so head-end stations must be present on the line to repeat the signals (ensuring that no packets travel through the line indefinitely) on either another, downstream direction frequency on the same line, or another line entirely. This also increases latency and prevents bidirectional signal flow.

The extra complexity outweighed the advantage of reusability of CATV technology for the intended campus networks and metropolitan area networks. An installer at Boston University using the Ungermann-Bass product noted that no installers understood both the digital and the analog aspects of the system. In wide area networks it was quickly replaced by fiber-optic communication alternatives, such as 100BASE-FX (which provided ten times the data rate). Interest in cable modems was revived for residential Internet access, through later technologies, such as Data Over Cable Service Interface Specification (DOCSIS), introduced in the 1990s and they are still widely used today.

== See also ==
- 10PASS-TS
