= Cable Internet access =

Form of broadband Internet access

In telecommunications, cable Internet access, shortened to cable Internet, is a form of broadband internet access which uses the same infrastructure as cable television. Like digital subscriber line (DSL) and fiber to the premises, cable Internet access provides network edge connectivity (last mile access) from the Internet service provider to an end user. It is integrated into the cable television infrastructure analogously to DSL, which uses the existing telephone network. Cable TV networks and telecommunications networks are the two predominant forms of residential Internet access. Recently, both have seen increased competition from fiber deployments, wireless, and satellite internet access.

== Hardware and bit rates ==
Broadband cable Internet access requires a cable modem at the customer's premises and a cable modem termination system (CMTS) at a cable operator facility, typically a cable television headend. The two are connected via coaxial cable to a hybrid fibre-coaxial (HFC) network. While access networks are referred to as last-mile technologies, cable Internet systems can typically operate where the distance between the modem and the termination system is up to 160 kilometres (99 mi). If the HFC network is large, the cable modem termination system can be grouped into hubs for efficient management. Several standards have been used for cable internet, but the most common is Data Over Cable Service Interface Specification (DOCSIS).

A cable modem at the customer is connected via coaxial cable to an optical node, and thus into an HFC network. An optical node serves many modems as the modems are connected with coaxial cable to a coaxial cable "trunk" via distribution "taps" on the trunk, which then connects to the node, possibly using amplifiers along the trunk. The optical node converts the radio frequency (RF) signal in the coaxial cable trunk into light pulses to be sent through optical fibers in the HFC network. At the other end of the network, an optics platform or headend platform converts the light pulses into RF signals in coaxial cables again using transmitter and receiver modules, and the cable modem termination system (CMTS) connects to these coaxial cables. An example of an optics platform is the Arris CH3000. There are two coaxial cables at the CMTS for each node: one for the downstream (download speed signal), and the other for the upstream (upload speed signal). The CMTS then connects to the ISP's IP (Internet Protocol) network.

Downstream, the direction toward the user, bit rates can be as high as 1 Gbit/s. Upstream traffic, originating at the user, ranges from 384 kbit/s to more than 50 Mbit/s, although maximum effective range seems to be unknown. One downstream channel can handle hundreds of cable modems. As the system grows, the CMTS can be upgraded with more downstream and upstream ports, and grouped into hub CMTSs for efficient management.

Most DOCSIS cable modems restrict upload and download rates, with customizable limits. These limits are set in configuration files which are downloaded to the modem using the Trivial File Transfer Protocol, when the modem first establishes a connection to the provider's equipment. Some users have attempted to override the bandwidth cap and gain access to the full bandwidth of the system by uploading their own configuration file to the cable modem, a process called uncapping.

== Shared bandwidth ==
In most residential broadband technologies, such as cable Internet, DSL, satellite internet, or wireless broadband, a population of users share the available bandwidth. Some technologies share only their core network, while some including cable internet and passive optical network (PON) also share the access network. This arrangement allows the network operator to take advantage of statistical multiplexing, a bandwidth sharing technique which is employed to distribute bandwidth fairly, in order to provide an adequate level of service at an acceptable price. However, the operator has to monitor usage patterns and scale the network appropriately, to ensure that customers receive adequate service even during peak-usage times. If the network operator does not provide enough bandwidth for a particular neighborhood, the connection would become saturated and speeds would drop if many people are using the service at the same time, or drop out completely. Operators have been known to use a bandwidth cap, or other bandwidth throttling technique; users' download speed is limited during peak times, if they have downloaded a large amount of data that day.

== See also ==
- Cable modem
- Digital cable
- Internet service provider
- Network service provider
- Internet access
- Triple play (telecommunications) - single coaxial cable connection for internet, TV and telephone service
