= Terayon =

American networking equipment manufacturer

Terayon Communication Systems
- Terayon logo
- Type: Public (Nasdaq: TERN)
- Industry: Communications and networking
- Founded: 1993
- Founder: Zaki Rakib and Shlomo Rakib
- Defunct: 2006
- Fate: Acquired by Motorola
- Headquarters: Santa Clara, California, United States
- Products: Video, voice, and data solutions
- Revenue: $136.48m (2004)
- Website: www.terayon.com

Terayon Communication Systems, Inc. was a company that vended equipment to broadband service providers for delivering broadband voice, video and data services to residential and business subscribers.

== History ==
Terayon was founded by Israeli brothers Zaki Rakib and Shlomo Rakib in 1993; both brothers graduated from high school at age 16 and went on to university. Shlomo studied electrical engineering, and Zaki did a PhD in mechanical engineering and post-doctorate studies in applied mathematics. He taught for a while at Tel Aviv University’s computer science faculty, and then joined Helios. After Helios was sold to Cadence Design Systems, Zaki moved to the US, and urged his brother to join him and set up the company. Terayon held an IPO on NASDAQ in August 1998.

In 1999, the company initiated a strategy to expand its offerings to the telecommunication and satellite industries but later refocused its business on the cable industry in 2000. During 1999 and 2000 the company acquired seven other companies, including: Imedia, a video processing startup founded by Efi Arazi (founder of Scitex) for $100m; Radwiz for $64m from the Rad Group, Teledata Networks (which was later sold) and Ultracom Communications for $32m in March 2000.

In 2004, Terayon recentered its strategy on digital video solutions, marketing to television broadcasters, telecom carriers and satellite television providers. Terayon also decided to phase out equipment for home access, such as cable modems and home networking devices.

In April 2006, Terayon was delisted from NASDAQ due to outstanding financial reports. Motorola Inc. acquired Terayon for $140 million in June 2007.

== See also ==
- Motorola Inc.
