= Teleste =

Finnish technology company

Teleste Oyj
- Company type: Julkinen osakeyhtiö
- Traded as: Nasdaq Helsinki: TLT1V
- Founded: 1954; 72 years ago
- Headquarters: Turku, Finland
- Key people: Esa Harju (CEO)
- Products: Broadband networks, video security and passenger information technologies, and related services
- Revenue: ▼€144.0 million
- Operating income: ▲€8.7 million
- Net income: ▲€6.9 million
- Number of employees: 847
- Website: www.teleste.com

Teleste Oyj is an international technology group in broadband, security and information technologies and related services. The company's customer base consists of data communications operators, train manufacturers, public transport operators, and public sector organizations.

Teleste was established in 1954 in Finland and is listed on the NASDAQ OMX Helsinki stock market since 1999.

Teleste has its own manufacturing in Littoinen and Forssa, Finland and product development units in Finland, Poland, Germany, Italy and Belgium.

== Organization ==
Since January 2022, the president and CEO of Teleste is Esa Harju.

Teleste has around 850 employees located in over 20 countries. The company is arranged into two business units: Networks and Public Safety Mobility.

=== Teleste Networks ===
Teleste Networks business unit offers broadband network and video headend technologies for telecommunications and cable operators. Its most significant customer base consists of data communications operators, but the customers can also include retailers that use Teleste's products for their end-to-end deliveries. The Networks unit's main market is Europe, but it also has customer business in North America.

The Networks unit develops, designs and manufactures a large part of its products. Its product development units operate in Finland and Belgium and the in-house manufacturing activities mainly take place in Finland. The product range also includes third-party products that complement Teleste's offering.

The Networks unit also offers services for access network design, construction and maintenance. The customer base for the unit's services mainly consists of large European cable network operators and new fibre network operators. The Networks unit's services are focused on England, Switzerland, Finland and Poland.

=== Public Safety Mobility Solutions ===
Teleste Public Safety Mobility Solutions business unit provides professional video and information management applications, systems and services for public safety authorities and operators as well as public transport operators and rolling stock manufacturers. The unit's main market is Europe, but it also operates in North America and the Middle East.

The unit develops, designs and manufactures a large part of its products. Its product development units operate in Finland, Germany, Italy and Poland, and the in-house manufacturing activities mainly take place in Finland.
