= Delay Doppler =

Delay Doppler coordinates are coordinates typically used in a radar technology-inspired approach to measurement. When used in wireless communication, the Delay Doppler domain mirrors the geometry of the reflectors comprising the Wireless channel, which changes far more slowly than the phase changes experienced in the rapidly varying time-frequency domain.

== Delay Doppler Signal Representation ==
In radar theory, the Delay Doppler variables are used to represent and separate moving targets through their delay (range) and Doppler (velocity) characteristics. In communication, the variables represent channels through a superposition of time and frequency shift operations.

Delay Doppler variables can also represent information-carrying signals. The Delay Doppler signal representation, sometimes referred to as the lattice representation of the Heisenberg group, is in a sense a hybrid of the traditional time and frequency representations.

In the time representation, a signal is realized as a function of time (superposition of delta functions); in the frequency representation, signal is realized as a function of frequency (superposition of complex exponentials).

The time and frequency representations are complementary to one another. The mathematical expression of this complementarity is captured by the Heisenberg uncertainty principle, which states that a signal cannot be simultaneously localized to any desired degree in time and in frequency. In contrast, in the Delay Doppler representation, one can construct localized pulses which behave as if they are simultaneously localized both in time and in frequency. Such delay-Doppler pulses can be used effectively for Delay Doppler Radar multi-target detection and wireless communication.

In the communication context, a key property of the delay-Doppler representation of the channel is that it does not experience the rapid phase changes present in the traditional time-frequency channel representation used by multi-carrier techniques (see fig. 1). This immunity amounts to slowing down the channel aging process, which has implications for various network functions that require extended latency, such as MU-MIMO[4][9] and CRAN.

== Next-Generation Waveforms in the Delay-Doppler Domain ==
In wireless communications, the Delay-Doppler domain provides a framework to address challenges in doubly dispersive channels, where multipath propagation causes delay spreads and mobility induces Doppler shifts. This domain’s ability to represent channel dynamics has inspired advanced waveforms for high-mobility scenarios. Orthogonal Time–Frequency Space modulation leverages the Delay-Doppler grid to map data symbols, enhancing reliability in applications like vehicular communications by mitigating rapid channel variations. Conversely, Affine Frequency Division Multiplexing adapts to sparse, dynamic channels, improving performance where traditional methods falter. A comparative study by H. S. Rou et al. (2024) analyzed OTFS and AFDM for integrated sensing and communications (ISAC), demonstrating OTFS’s robustness against Doppler effects and AFDM’s efficiency in sparse channels. Rou’s work highlights the Delay-Doppler domain’s potential to unify sensing and communication, advancing its role in 5G, 6G, and beyond.

== Application ==
When the delay-Doppler channel representation is appropriately incorporated in MU-MIMO architecture, it enables non-trivial network functionality, such as intelligent user pairings and SNR predictions.

These functionalities result in improved spectral utilization and performance for any waveform, thus constituting a universal technology of spectrum multiplying for mobile networks that can operate in both FDD and TDD and with any generation network.

Delay Doppler channel representation utilizes existing uplink reference signals such as SRS & DMRS, along with periodic DL CQI reports to extract robust geometric information and to compute downlink SINR and predict downlink CSI — even on paired FDD spectrum separated by as much as 400MHz. SRS is a key source for channel information. Delay Doppler processing techniques are used to extract robust geometric information about the link to every user, yielding accurate DL SINR estimation as well as precise DL CSI (extrapolated in frequency and predicted in time).

Due to its geometric nature, the slow changing Delay Doppler channel representation opens up the door for functionality disaggregation. Specifically, channel predictions can remain accurate for approximately 50-100 milliseconds (depending on the environment). This enables Cloud RAN and the foundation to improve cell edge performance via intercell coordination. The software can reside in the near-real time RAN Intelligent Controller (RIC) as an xAPP within the O-RAN architecture and can support hyper-reliable, low latency 5G requirements. Such software can also be deployed on any x86-based platform and can be integrated into existing base stations or deployed next to existing base stations through defined interfaces.

When wireless channels are represented and processed in the delay-Doppler domain, 4G and 5G networks can effectively utilize MU-MIMO in both TDD and FDD, and the channel measurements become more robust to latency (cloud), channel impairments and high mobility.
