= Henric Rungeen =

Finnish merchant

- Died: 1742; Stockholm, Sweden
- Occupation: merchant
- Spouses: (unknown); Katarina née Niska
- Children: Johan (1720–1793); Katarina (1725–1788); Matias (ca. 1729–1753); Gustaf; Kristina

Henric Rungeen (in some sources Hindrich Rungeen or Rungen, d. 1742) was a Finnish merchant and early industrialist.

Rungeen belonged to the riches bourgeois of his home city Turku. He was involved in shipping and foreign trade; later he invested on milling, sawmilling, brewing, distilling, iron processing, and most importantly, shipbuilding and textile industry.

Rungeen escaped to Stockholm during the Hats' War and died in exile in 1742.

== Career ==
=== Early career ===
Rungeen belonged to an old bourgeois family of Turku. His career as merchant began in 1711, just two years before the Russian occupation of Finland. After the almost decade-long occupation Rungeen was one of the most active Turku merchants who contributed rebuilding of the city. According to the surviving taxation documents, Rungeen was the third riches merchant of Turku. Rungeen funded for example renovation of the city hall, main guard building and a new bridge over river Aura. In 1732 he made an offer for building a new city hall but eventually a slightly more expensive plan of the City Architect Samuel Berner became selected.

=== Shipping ===
Rungeen's focus was in foreign trade. Following to the Great Northern War, there were no large merchant ships in the city. Therefore, most of the imported goods were circulated through Stockholm. In 1726 Rungeen bought a merchant ship size of just 48 läst, but it was large enough to operate profitably to Amsterdam. It took until the early 1730s the city had an ocean-worthy ship; this was Ostrobothnian built Södra Finlands Vapen with capacity of 250 läst. Rungeen owned a quarter share of the ship. Södra Finlands Vapen brought every year 5 000 – 6 000 barrels of salt from Portugal and Spain; this covered half of the demand in Turku and its vicinity.

=== Milling and beverage production ===
In the 1720s Rungeen bought large flour mills; he owned at least one watermill in Paimio and two windmills in Turku. Rungeen started wine importing and around in 1725 he rented the city brewery, which however, burned down already in 1728. In the early 1730s Rungeen invested on distillery.

In 1730 Rungeen was the richest bourgeois of the city; his property was worth of 20 000 silver thalers, which was twice as much as the second richest owned.

=== Sawmilling and iron processing ===
As demand of timber increased after the Great Northern War, Rungeen invested on sawmilling. Recently introduced Dutch style fine-toothed saws increased productivity. He founded a sawmill in Inkere, Pertteli, and another one in Aro, Paimio; the latter one he started together with another Turku merchant Carl Merthen. Rungeen also bought a share of Raala sawmill in Nurmijärvi. The produced timber was partly used for reconstruction in Finland and partly exported.

In 1738 Rungeen rented with six other merchants Teijo iron mill in Perniö for five years, Kuusto iron works and Kirjakkala iron mill complex.

=== Shipbuilding ===
Rungeen started Turku shipbuilding industry in 1738 together with merchants Esaias Wechter and Gustaf Adolf Wittfooth in 1738. The company manager became Scottish born Robert Fithie. The first vessel, called Fortuna, was completed in 1739. The following ship was sold to Stockholm, but after this Rungeen got disputes with Wechter, and sold him his share of the shipyard. The last ship was finished just right before beginning of a new Russian occupation, and it left Turku transporting refugees to Stockholm.

=== Textile industry ===
Before their dispute, Rungeen and Wechter applied for a permit to start a baize manufactory in 1738. The permit was given in the following year. Rungeen carried the biggest responsibility of the construction work during Wechter participated in the Diet of Sweden. The men started a fulling facility in Littoinen and the textiles were dyed in Wechter's dyeing works. After the rift, Wechter ran the business alone. According to his own words, Rungeen had nothing to do with the baize manufactory after August 1739; however, he sold his share to Wechter just a couple of years later.

Rungeen escaped when Russian army advanced to Turku. He died in 1742 in Stockholm.
