= Ronny Hadani =

Israeli-American mathematician

- רוני הדני
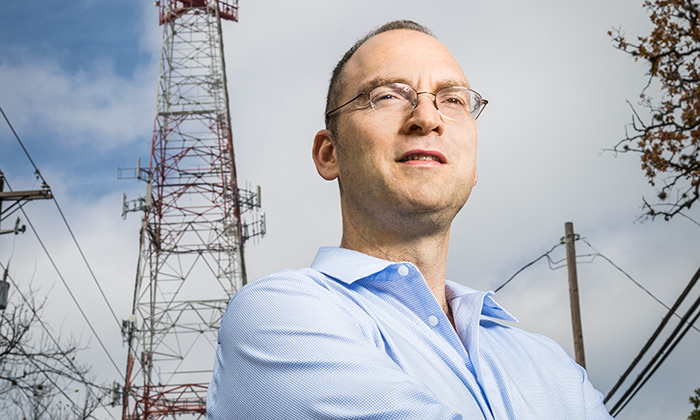
- Occupations: Mathematician; Professor; Author

Ronny Hadani (Hebrew: רוני הדני) is an Israeli-American mathematician, specializing in representation theory and harmonic analysis, with applications to signal processing. He is known for developing Orthogonal Time Frequency and Space (OTFS) modulating techniques, a method used for making wireless 5G communications faster, that is also being considered for use in 6G technology. The technology is being used by several wireless 5G related companies and Cohere Technologies, a company he has co-founded.

== Early life and education ==
Hadani received his MS degree in Computer Science from the Weizmann Institute of Science in 1999 under the supervision of David Harel. He received his Ph.D. degree in Pure Mathematics from Tel-Aviv University in 2006 under the supervision of Joseph Bernstein.

== Career ==
=== Academia ===
From the years 2006 to 2009, Hadani held an L.E. Dickson Postdoctoral Fellowship of Mathematics at the University of Chicago. Since 2009, he has been an associate professor of mathematics at the University of Texas, Austin.

=== Cohere Technologies ===
In 2010, Hadani co-founded Cohere Technologies with Shlomo Rakib. The company is a Silicon Valley wireless startup that focuses on wireless improvements using OTFS and the Delay-Doppler model to improve FDD/TDD spectrum performance with channel detection, estimation, prediction, and precoding software for 4G and 5G networks, compliant with 3GPP standards and O-RAN.

In December 2022, during the inaugural 6G Evolution Summit event opening keynote, Fierce Wireless moderator referred to Hadani as “The Father of OTFS.”

== Patents ==
Hadani has been granted over 70 OTFS related patents, which include a communications method employing Orthogonal Time Frequency Space (OTFS) shifting and spectral shaping, which allows users to transmit and receive at least one frame of data ([D]) over a wireless communications link. He has also patented methods of operating and implementing wireless OTFS communications systems. His OTFS technology has been tested by companies such as C Spire, 5TONIC, Telefónica, and Deutsche Telekom,

== Selected publications ==
=== Papers in journals ===
- Hadani, Ronny; Gurevich, Shamgar (July 2014). "The categorical weil representation". Journal of Symplectic Geometry. arXiv:1108.0351.
- Fish, Alexander; Gurevich, Shamgar; Hadani, Ronny; Sayeed, Akbar M.; Schwartz, Oded (November 2013). "Delay-doppler channel estimation in almost linear complexity". IEEE Transactions on Information Theory. 59 (11): 7632–7644. arXiv:1208.4405. Bibcode:2013ITIT...59.7632F. doi:10.1109/TIT.2013.2273931. S2CID 230975.
- Hadani, Ronny; Gurevich, Shamgar (2012). "The Weil representation in characteristic two" (PDF). Advances in Mathematics. 230 (3): 894–926. arXiv:0808.1664. doi:10.1016/j.aim.2012.03.008. S2CID 17843124.
- Hadani, Ronny; Gurevich, Shamgar (2008). "The geometric Weil representation". Advances in Mathematics. 13 (3). arXiv:math/0610818. Bibcode:2006math.....10818G.
- Gurevich, Shamgar; Hadani, Ronny; Sochen, Nir (August 2008). "The Finite Harmonic Oscillator and Its Applications to Sequences, Communication, and Radar". IEEE Transactions on Information Theory. 54 (9): 4239–4253. arXiv:0808.1495. Bibcode:2008ITIT...54.4239G. doi:10.1109/TIT.2008.926440. S2CID 6037080.

== Academic works ==
According to Google Scholar, Hadani has published over 75 research papers and patents. His works have been cited over 3300 times.

=== Patents ===
- OTFS methods of data channel characterization and uses thereof, R Hadani, SS Rakib, US Patent 9,668,148, Cited 188 Times.
- Signal modulation method resistant to echo reflections and frequency offsets, SS Rakib, R Hadani. US Patent 9,083,595, Cited 183 Times.
- Modulation and equalization in an orthonormal time-frequency shifting communications system, R Hadani, SS Rakib, US Patent 9,590,779, Cited 182 times.
- Communications method employing orthonormal time-frequency shifting and spectral shaping, R Hadani, SS Rakib, US Patent 8,547,988, Cited 96 Times.

=== Academic papers ===
- Orthogonal time frequency space modulation, R Hadani, S Rakib, M Tsatsanis, A Monk, AJ Goldsmith, AF Molisch, 2017 IEEE Wireless Communications and Networking Conference (WCNC), 1-6, Cited 228 Times.
- Viewing angle classification of cryo-electron microscopy images using eigenvectors, A Singer, Z Zhao, Y Shkolnisky, R Hadani, SIAM Journal on Imaging Sciences 4 (2), 723-759, Cited 92 Times.
