= Cable modem =

Broadband Internet access device

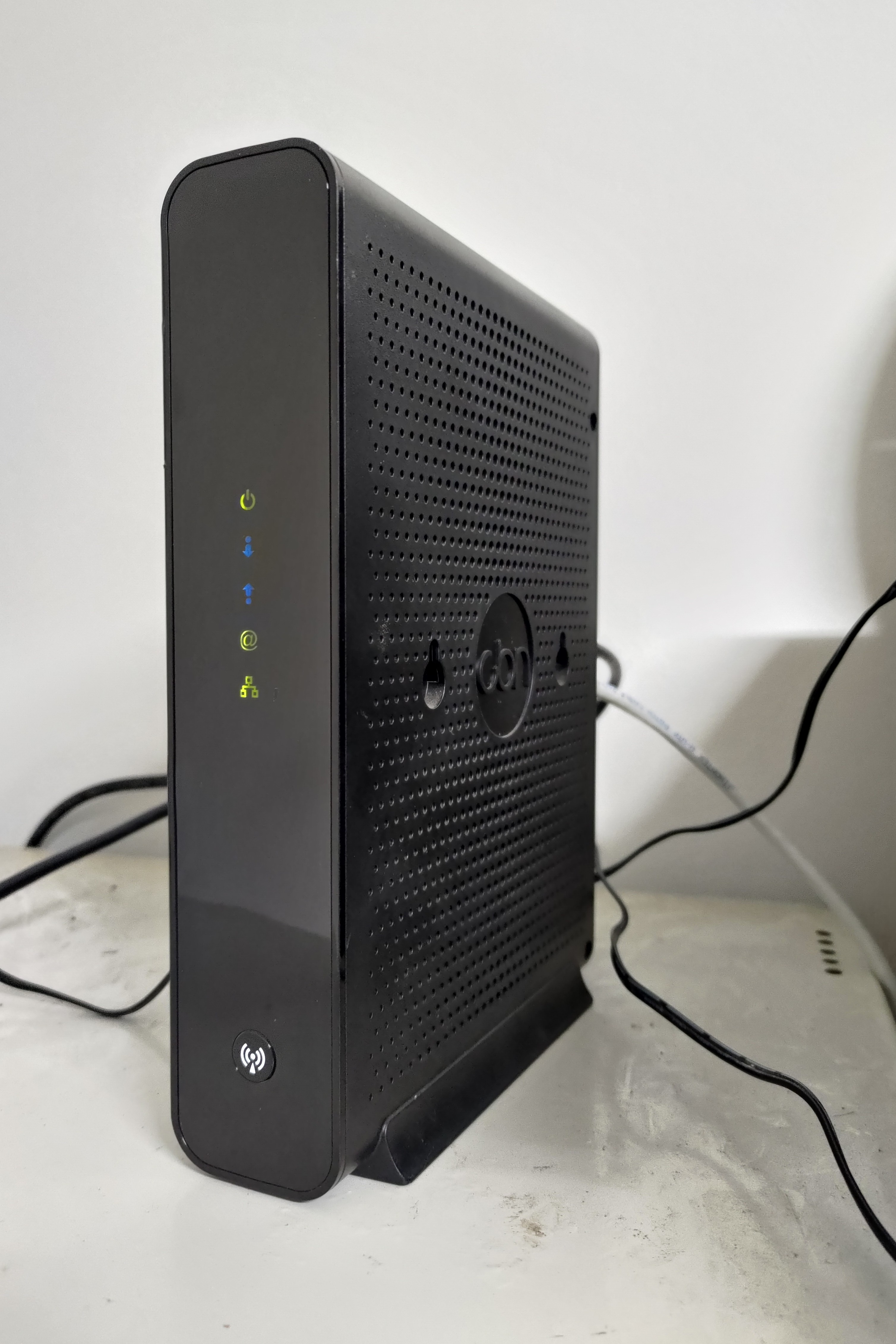
Example of a cable modem installed in a home office.

A cable modem is a type of network bridge or gateway that provides bi-directional data communication via radio frequency channels on a hybrid fiber-coaxial, radio frequency over glass and coaxial cable infrastructure. Cable modems are primarily used to deliver broadband Internet access in the form of cable Internet. They are commonly deployed in the Americas, Asia, Australia, and Europe.

== History ==
=== MITRE Cablenet ===
Internet Experiment Note (IEN) 96 (1979) describes an early RF cable modem system. From pages 2 and 3 of IEN 96:

The Cable-Bus System

The MITRE/Washington Cablenet system is based on a technology developed at MITRE/Bedford. Similar cable-bus systems are in operation at a number of government sites, e.g. Walter Reed Army Hospital, and the NASA Johnson Space Center, but these are all standalone, local-only networks.

The system uses standard community antenna television (CATV) coaxial cable and microprocessor based Bus Interface Units (BIUs) to connect subscriber computers and terminals to the cable. ... The cable bus consists of two parallel coaxial cables, one inbound and the other outbound. The inbound cable and outbound cable are connected at one end, the headend, and electrically terminated at their other ends. This architecture takes advantage of the well developed unidirectional CATV components. The topology is dendritic (i.e. branched like a tree).
...

The BIUs contain Radio Frequency (RF) modems which modulate a carrier signal to transmit digital information using 1 MHz of the available bandwidth in the 24 MHz frequency range. The remainder of the 294 MHz bandwidth can be used to carry other communication channels, such as off-the-air TV, FM, closed circuit TV, or a voice telephone system, or, other digital channels. The data rate of our test-bed system is 307.2 kbps.

=== 10BROAD36 ===
The IEEE 802 Committee defined 10BROAD36 in 802.3b-1985 as a 10 Mbit/s IEEE 802.3 broadband system to run up to 3,600 metres (11,800 ft) over CATV coax network cabling. The word broadband as used in the original IEEE 802.3 specifications implied operation in frequency-division multiplexed (FDM) channel bands as opposed to digital baseband modulation (also known as line coding), which begins near zero Hz and extends upward. 10BROAD36 equipment was not developed by many vendors nor deployed in many user networks as compared to equipment for baseband Ethernet standards such as 10BASE5 (1983), 10BASE2 (1985), 10BASE-T (1990), etc.

=== IEEE 802.7 ===
The IEEE 802 Committee also specified a broadband CATV digital networking standard in 1989 with 802.7-1989. However, like 10BROAD36, 802.7-1989 saw little commercial success.

=== Hybrid Networks ===
Hybrid Networks developed, demonstrated and patented the first high-speed, asymmetrical cable modem system in 1990. A key Hybrid Networks insight was that in the nascent days of the Internet, data downloading constituted the majority of the data traffic, and this could be served adequately with a highly asymmetrical data network (i.e., a large downstream data pipe and many small upstream data pipes). This allowed CATV operators to offer high-speed data services immediately without first requiring an expensive system upgrade. Also key was that it saw that the upstream and downstream communications could be on the same or different communications media using different protocols respectively working in each direction to establish a closed-loop communications system. The speeds and protocols used in each direction would be very different. The earliest systems used the public switched telephone network (PSTN) for the return path since very few cable systems were bi-directional. Later systems used CATV for the upstream as well as the downstream path. Hybrid's system architecture is used for most cable modem systems today.

=== LANcity ===
LANcity was an early pioneer in cable modems, developing a proprietary system that was widely deployed in the U.S. LANcity, which was led by the Iranian-American engineer Rouzbeh Yassini, was then acquired by Bay Networks. Bay Networks was subsequently acquired by Nortel. Nortel at the time had formed a joint-venture with Antec called ARRIS Interactive. Because of contractual agreements with Antec involving this joint venture, Nortel spun the LANCity group out into the ARRIS Interactive joint-venture. ARRIS continues to make cable modems and cable modem termination system (CMTS) equipment compliant with the DOCSIS standard.

=== Zenith homeworks ===
Zenith, being one of the first cable modem providers, offered a cable modem technology using its own protocol, which it introduced in 1993. The Zenith Cable Modem technology was used by several cable television systems in the United States and other countries, including Cox Communications San Diego, Knology in the Southeast United States, Ameritech's Americast service (later to be sold off to Wide Open West after the SBC and Ameritech merger), Cogeco in Hamilton Ontario and Cablevision du Nord de Québec in Val-d'Or. Zenith Homeworks used binary phase-shift keying to achieve 500 Kbit/s in 600 kHz, or 4 Mbit/s in 6 MHz channel bandwidth.

=== Com21 ===
Com21 was another early pioneer in cable modems, and quite successful until proprietary systems were made obsolete by the DOCSIS standardization. The Com21 system used a ComController as the central bridge in CATV network head-ends, the ComPort cable modem in various models and the NMAPS management system using HP OpenView as the platform. Later, they also introduced a return-path multiplexer to mitigate noise when combining return-path signals from multiple areas. The proprietary protocol was based on Asynchronous Transfer Mode (ATM). The central ComController switch was a modular system offering one downstream channel (transmitter) and one management module. The remaining slots could be used for upstream receivers (two per card), dual Ethernet 10BASE-T and later also Fast Ethernet and ATM interfaces. The ATM interface became the most popular, as it supported the increasing bandwidth demands and also supported VLANs. Com21 developed a DOCSIS modem, but the company filed for bankruptcy in 2003 and closed. The DOCSIS CMTS assets of Com21 were acquired by ARRIS.

=== CDLP ===
CDLP was a proprietary system manufactured by Motorola. CDLP customer premises equipment was capable of both PSTN (telephone network) and radio frequency (cable) return paths. The PSTN-based service was considered one-way cable and had many of the same drawbacks as satellite Internet service; as a result, it quickly gave way to two-way cable. Cable modems that used the RF cable network for the return path were considered two-way cable, and were better able to compete with the bi-directional digital subscriber line (DSL) service. The standard is in little use now as new providers use, and existing providers have changed to, the DOCSIS standard. The Motorola CDLP proprietary CyberSURFR is an example of a device that was built to the CDLP standard, capable of a peak 10 Mbit/s downstream and 1.532 Mbit/s upstream. CDLP supported a maximum downstream bandwidth of 30 Mbit/s, which could be reached by using multiple modems.

The Australian ISP BigPond employed this system when it started cable modem tests in 1996. For a number of years cable Internet access was only available in Sydney, Melbourne and Brisbane via CDLP. This network ran parallel to the newer DOCSIS system for several years. In 2004, the CDLP network was terminated and replaced by DOCSIS. CDLP had also been rolled out at the French cable operator Numericable before upgrading its IP broadband network using DOCSIS.

=== DVB/DAVIC ===
Digital Video Broadcasting (DVB) and Digital Audio Visual Council (DAVIC) are European-formed organizations that developed cable modem standards. However, these standards have not been as widely adopted as DOCSIS.

=== IEEE 802.14 ===
In the mid-1990s the IEEE 802 committee formed a working group, IEEE 802.14, to develop a standard for cable modem systems. IEEE 802.14 developed a draft standard, which was ATM-based. However, the IEEE 802.14 working group was disbanded when North American multiple system operators (MSOs) instead backed the then-fledgling DOCSIS 1.0 specification, which generally used best-effort service and was IP-based (with extension codepoints to support ATM for QoS in the future). MSOs were interested in quickly deploying service to compete for broadband Internet access customers instead of waiting on the slower, iterative, and deliberative processes of standards development committees. Albert A. Azzam was Secretary of the IEEE 802.14 Working Group, and his book, High-Speed Cable Modems, describes many of the proposals submitted to IEEE 802.14.

=== IETF ===
Although the Internet Engineering Task Force (IETF) generally does not generate complete cable modem standards, the IETF chartered Working Groups (WGs) that produced various standards related to cable modem technologies (including 802.14, DOCSIS, PacketCable, and others). In particular, the IETF WGs on IP over Cable Data Network (IPCDN) and IP over Digital Video Broadcasting (DVB) produced some standards applicable to cable modem systems, primarily in the areas of Simple Network Management Protocol (SNMP) Management Information Bases (MIBs) for cable modems and other networking equipment that operates over CATV networks.

=== DOCSIS ===
In the late 1990s, a consortium of US cable operators, known as "MCNS" formed to quickly develop an open and interoperable cable modem specification. The group essentially combined technologies from the two dominant proprietary systems at the time, taking the physical layer from the Motorola CDLP system and the MAC layer from the LANcity system. When the initial specification had been drafted, the MCNS consortium handed over control of it to CableLabs which maintained the specification, promoted it in various standards organizations (notably SCTE and ITU), developed a certification testing program for cable modem equipment, and has since drafted multiple extensions to the original specification.

While deployed DOCSIS RFI 1.0 equipment generally only supported best-effort service, the DOCSIS RFI 1.0 Interim-01 document discussed quality of service (QoS) extensions and mechanisms using IntServ, RSVP, RTP, and Synchronous Transfer Mode (STM) telephony (as opposed to ATM). DOCSIS RFI 1.1 later added more robust and standardized QoS mechanisms to DOCSIS. DOCSIS 2.0 added support for S-CDMA PHY, while DOCSIS 3.0 added IPv6 support and channel bonding to allow a single cable modem to use concurrently more than one upstream channel and more than one downstream channel in parallel.

Virtually all cable modems operating in the field today are compliant with one of the DOCSIS versions. Because of the differences in the European PAL and US's NTSC systems two main versions of DOCSIS exist, DOCSIS and EuroDOCSIS. The main differences are found in the width of RF-channels: 6 MHz for the US and 8 MHz for Europe. A third variant of DOCSIS was developed in Japan and has seen limited deployment in that country.

Although interoperability "was the whole point of the DOCSIS project," most cable operators only approve a very restricted list of cable modems on their network, identifying the 'allowed' modems by their brand, models, sometimes firmware version and occasionally going as far as imposing a hardware version of the modem, instead of simply allowing a supported DOCSIS version.

=== Multimedia over Coax Alliance ===
In 2004, the Multimedia over Coax Alliance (MoCA) was established to develop industry standards for the connected home using the existing coaxial cabling. Initially developed for in-home networking with MoCA 1.0/1.1, the MoCA standards have continued to develop with MoCA 2.0/2.1 in 2010 and MoCa 2.5 in 2016.

In 2017, Multimedia over Coax Alliance introduced MoCA Access specification, based on the MoCA 2.5 standard, suitable for addressing broadband network access in-building using coaxial cabling. MoCA Access extends MoCA 2.5 in-home networking to fit operators and ISPs that are installing fiber-to-the-basement/drop point (FTTB/FTTdp) and want to use the existing coax for connection to each apartment or house."

== Multimedia terminal adapter ==
With the development of voice over Internet Protocol (VoIP) telephony, analog telephone adapters (ATA) have been incorporated into many cable modems for providing telephone service. An embedded ATA is known as an embedded multimedia terminal adapter (E-MTA).

Many cable TV service providers also offer VoIP-based telephone service via the cable infrastructure (PacketCable). Some high-speed Internet customers may use VoIP telephony by subscribing to a third-party service, such as Vonage, MagicJack+ and NetTALK.

== Network architectural functions ==
In network topology, a cable modem is a network bridge that conforms to IEEE 802.1D for Ethernet networking (with some modifications). The cable modem bridges Ethernet frames between a customer LAN and the coax network. Technically, it is a modem because it must modulate data to transmit it over the cable network, and it must demodulate data from the cable network to receive it.

It implements an Ethernet PHY on its LAN interface, and a DOCSIS-defined cable-specific PHY on its HFC cable interface. The term cable modem refers to this cable-specific PHY. The Network Layer is implemented as an IP host in that it has its own IP address used by the network operator to maintain the device. In the transport layer the cable modem supports UDP in association with its own IP address, and it supports filtering based on TCP and UDP port numbers to, for example, block forwarding of NetBIOS traffic out of the customer's LAN. In the Application Layer, the cable modem supports certain protocols that are used for management and maintenance, notably Dynamic Host Configuration Protocol (DHCP), SNMP, and TFTP.

Some cable modems may incorporate a router and a DHCP server to provide the LAN with IP network addressing. From a data forwarding and network topology perspective, this router functionality is typically kept distinct from the cable modem functionality (at least logically) even though the two may share a single enclosure and appear as one unit, sometimes called a residential gateway. So, the cable modem function will have its own IP address and MAC address as will the router.

== Cable modem flap ==
Cable modems can have a problem known in industry jargon as "flap" or "flapping". A modem flap is when the connection by the modem to the head-end has been dropped (gone offline) and then comes back online. The time offline or rate of flap is not typically recorded, only the incidence. While this is a common occurrence and usually unnoticed, if a modem's flap is extremely high, these disconnects can cause service to be disrupted. If there are usability problems due to flap the typical cause is a defective modem or very high amounts of traffic on the service provider's network (upstream utilization too high). Types of flap include reinsertions, hits and misses, and power adjustments.

== Known vulnerabilities ==
In January 2020, a vulnerability affecting cable modems using Broadcom chipsets was disclosed and named Cable Haunt. Security researchers say that the vulnerability affects hundreds of millions of devices. Exploits are possible because of the use of default credentials in the spectrum analyzer component of the modem (mostly used for debugging purposes) accessible through a network port which is open by default in the vulnerable models.

== See also ==
- Cable modem termination system (CMTS)
- Cable telephone
- Internet access with a cable modem
- List of device bandwidths
- NABU Network
- Triple play (telecommunications)
- HomePNA
