= Orthogonal Time Frequency Space =

2D modulation technique

Orthogonal Time Frequency Space (OTFS) is a 2D modulation technique that transforms the information carried in the Delay-Doppler coordinate system. The information is transformed in a similar time-frequency domain as utilized by the traditional schemes of modulation such as TDMA, CDMA, and OFDM. It was first used for fixed wireless, and is now a contending waveform for 6G technology due to its robustness in high-speed vehicular scenarios.

== Overview ==
OTFS is a modulation scheme where each transmitted symbol experiences a near-constant channel gain even in channels at high carrier frequencies (mm-wave) or with high Doppler. This OTFS signal is well localized in both the time and frequency domain. The transmitted signal is in the delay-doppler domain. OTFS waveform remains invariant under the operation of the time and frequency domains. When we transmit an OTFS waveform in the delay-doppler domain, we use the Zak transform. This OTFS will satisfy the Heisenberg Uncertainty principle (signal is localized in delay-doppler representation).

It effectively transforms the time-varying multipath channel into a 2D channel in the Delay-Doppler domain. Using this transformation, along with equalization within this domain, each symbol experiences similar channel gain throughout the transmission.

The modulation begins with first mapping the information symbols x[k,l] in the Delay–Doppler domain to symbols X [n, m] for creating the time-domain signal s(t) which is transmitted over a wireless channel. At the receiver end, the time-domain signal r(t) is mapped to the domain of time-frequency using the Wigner transform, which is the inverse of the Heisenberg transform and then for symbol demodulation uses the Delay–Doppler domain.

The technology is being considered for 6G networks.

In terms of transmission, the transmit signals of OTFS in either discrete time sequence or continuous time waveform are the same as that of single antenna vector OFDM (VOFDM) systems (Proceedings of ICC 2000, New Orleans, and IEEE Trans. on Communications, Aug. 2001), no matter a channel is stationary or not. There have been several works that have shown this. One of them is in Signal Processing 214 (2024), 109254. https://doi.org/10.1016/j.sigpro.2023.109254

== Channel Equalization and Estimation ==
Low complexity equalization has been proposed based on Message Passing (MP), Markov Chain Monte Carlo (MCMC), and Linear equalization methods. The diversity of OTFS modulation has been studied in. Channel estimation pilots are transmitted in the delay Doppler domain.

Iterative Rake decision feedback equalization achieves equivalent performance to message passing with a much lower complexity that is independent of the modulation size. The performance of OTFS modulation in static multi-path channels has also been studied.

== Practical Pulse Shaping Waveforms ==
It is impossible to transmit an ideal pulse shape due to the time-frequency uncertainty principle. This motivated some works for practical pulse shaped OTFS systems.

== Pulsone ==
A pulsone (stands for pulse + tone) is the time realization of a quasi-periodic pulse in delay-Doppler and it serves as the carrier waveform of the OTFS modulation format. Of particular interest are pulsones in the crystalline regime (when the periods are greater than the spread of the channel). In this regime, the pulsone remains invariant under the operations of time delay and Doppler shift which results in non-fading and predictable channel interaction, rendering pulsones ideal for mobility and machine learning applications.

== Zak-OTFS ==
See also: Zak-OTFS

Zak Transform-based Orthogonal Time Frequency Space (OTFS) is a modulation technique which carries information in the Delay-Doppler domain, rather than the time-frequency domain used by traditional modulations such as OFDM. It is optimized for challenging wireless communication environments applicable to 6G use cases, such as FR3, NTN and ISAC. Zak-OTFS is also designed to integrate seamlessly with the 3GPP stack so that scheduling and resource element allocation is unchanged. Zak-OTFS is flexible and inherently supports different channel conditions in real time (no need for different configurations).

== Application ==
OTFS offers several advantages in particular environments where the dispersion is at high frequency. Environments such as these are encountered in mm-wave systems, due to both larger Doppler spreads and higher phase noise. Application of OTFS waveforms for Radio Detection and Ranging (RADAR) have also been proposed recently.
