= CableLabs =

Trade association for cable operators

Cable Television Laboratories, Inc.
- Trade name: CableLabs
- Type: Nonprofit corporation
- Industry: Research and development
- Founded: 1988
- Founder: Richard Leghorn; John C. Malone; Richard Green (telecommunication)
- Headquarters: Louisville, Colorado, United States
- Key people: Phil McKinney, President & CEO
- Website: www.cablelabs.com

Cable Television Laboratories, Inc. (CableLabs) is a membership-based research and development consortium for the broadband industry. It works with network operators and the broader ecosystem to develop technical specifications and support interoperability testing.

== History ==
CableLabs was founded in 1988 as a membership-based research and development consortium for the cable industry. It was established to support collaboration among network operators and the development of shared technologies and technical specifications.

In the 1990s, as hybrid fiber-coaxial (HFC) networks expanded, CableLabs developed the Data Over Cable Service Interface Specification (DOCSIS), first released in 1997. In 1999, it introduced PacketCable specifications for voice over Internet Protocol (VoIP) services.

CableLabs has since continued to work with its member operators and the broader industry ecosystem to develop specifications and support interoperability testing of devices such as cable modem termination systems (CMTSs).

In partnership with NCTA – The Internet & Television Association, CableLabs announced the 10G platform in 2019, followed by the release of DOCSIS 4.0 specifications in 2020. DOCSIS 4.0 technology enabled networks to deliver symmetrical multi-gigabit speeds while supporting high reliability, high security and low latency. In 2022, CableLabs was named a host laboratory for the National Telecommunications and Information Administration (NTIA) 5G Challenge.

== Membership ==
System operators from around the world are eligible to be members.

CableLabs is funded and governed by its member companies, primarily broadband operators around the world. These companies collectively invest in technology research and development, as well as specifications, that benefit the entire broadband ecosystem.

Membership allows companies to participate directly in shaping industry technology and specifications — including innovations such as DOCSIS, advanced fiber, Wi-Fi and other network technologies.

=== Who Can Be Members ===
Membership is limited to multiple system operators (MSOs), such as cable broadband providers. Members include:

- Comcast
- Charter Communications
- Cox Communications
- Liberty Global
- Rogers
- Vodafone

== Vendor Community ==
The CableLabs vendor community includes companies that develop hardware, software, platform and technology service solutions used by broadband service providers, including CableLabs’ operator members. These organizations collaborate through CableLabs to support the development and evolution of broadband technologies and services.

== Research initiatives ==
CableLabs conducts research initiatives intended to anticipate changes in how people use broadband and to help the industry plan for what comes next. In 2024, CableLabs introduced the Technology Vision as a framework that describes key themes and focus areas intended to support industry alignment and long-term technology planning. The framework defines three themes that span broadband technologies: seamless connectivity, network platform evolution and pervasive intelligence, security and privacy. Together, these themes are presented as a model for building more adaptive networks.

== Affiliations and Subsidiaries ==
- Society of Cable Telecommunications Engineers
- Kyrio

== See also ==
- Tech Summit
- SCTE TechExpo
