= Rico Malvar =

Henrique S. Malvar
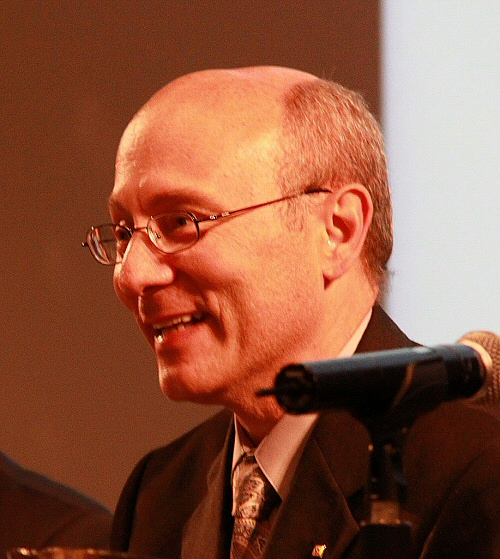
- Rico Malvar at an IEEE Conference in 2011
- Born: 1957 (age 68–69); Rio de Janeiro, Brazil
- Education: MIT (PhD); Federal University of Rio de Janeiro (MS); University of Brasília
- Known for: Lapped transform, Windows Media Audio codec, JPEG XR image codec
- Awards: Member of the US National Academy of Engineering - 2012, Fellow of the IEEE - 1997
- Scientific career
- Fields: Signal processing, Data compression, Harmonic analysis
- Workplaces: Microsoft Research, PictureTel
- Doctoral advisor: David H. Staelin
- Website: aka.ms/malvar

Henrique "Rico" S. Malvar (born 1957) is a distinguished Brazilian engineer and a signal processing researcher at Microsoft Research's largest laboratory in Redmond, Washington, United States. He was the managing director of the lab following the departure of long-time Managing Director Dan Ling in 2007, when he oversaw about 350 researchers. He was a Distinguished Engineer at Microsoft for over 15 years. He retired from Microsoft in January 2023, and later received the title of Microsoft Emeritus Researcher.

Rico is also an Affiliate Professor at the Electrical and Computer Engineering Department at the University of Washington.

== History and contributions ==
Malvar earned his bachelor's degree at the University of Brasília and his master's degree at the Federal University of Rio de Janeiro. He received his Ph.D. in electrical engineering and computer science from the Massachusetts Institute of Technology (MIT) in 1986, where his thesis was on "Optimal pre- and post-filtering in noisy sampled-data systems," and served as a visiting professor at MIT for the next year. From 1979 to 1993, Malvar was a faculty member at the University of Brasília, where he founded and headed the Digital Signal Processing Research Group (in Portuguese, Grupo de Processamento Digital de Sinais or GPDS).

Malvar is known for the development of the lapped transform, Malvar wavelets, and new algorithms for entropy coding and multimedia signal processing and compression, such as audio and image codecs.

In industry, Malvar served as vice president of Research and Advanced Technology at PictureTel from 1985 to 1987 (which has since been acquired by Polycom). In Fall 1997, he joined Microsoft Research where he co-founded and managed the Signal Processing research group, now the Communication and Collaboration Systems and Knowledge Tools groups. He was a Redmond lab director from 2004 to 2007 before stepping up to become managing director. In 2010 he took on a new position of Chief Scientist, working on cross-labs strategic projects. Currently, as a Distinguished Engineer, he leads a team that develops new user experiences with new devices and new input/output interaction modes, with special attention to inclusiveness and empowering people with disabilities.

At Microsoft, Malvar contributed to the development of audio coding and digital rights management for the Windows Media Audio, Windows Media Video, and to image compression technologies, such as HD Photo / JPEG XR formats and the RemoteFX bitmap compression, as well as to a variety of tools for signal analysis and synthesis.

As of February 2022, he has published over 180 technical articles and has authored or co-authored over 120 issued patents.

== Editorial and committee positions ==
Malvar has served as an editor or committee member for the following journals, conferences, and organizations:

- Associate editor of IEEE Transactions on Signal Processing
- Editorial board of Applied and Computational Harmonic Analysis
- Technical committee for the IEEE International Conference on Acoustics, Speech, and Signal Processing (ICASSP)
- Technical committee for the Data Compression Conference (DCC)
- Advisory committee for the National Science Foundation Directorate for Computer & Information Science & Engineering
- Member of the Special Nomination Committee for the National Academy of Engineering

== Titles and awards ==
Malvar holds the following prestigious titles and awards. A sample:

- 1981: The Young Scientist Award from the Marconi International Fellowship Foundation
- 1992: Best Paper Award in Image Processing from the IEEE Signal Processing Society
- 1997: Fellow of the Institute of Electrical and Electronics Engineers (IEEE) for contributions to the theory and practice of lapped transforms, fast multirate filterbanks, and signal coding.
- 2002: Technical Achievement Award from the IEEE Signal Processing Society
- 2004: Wavelet Pioneer Award from SPIE
- 2006: Distinguished Engineer at Microsoft.
- 2012: Member of the US National Academy of Engineering (NAE).
- 2014: 20th Century Landmark Award, IEEE Seattle Section.
- 2020: Amar G. Bose Industrial Leader Award, IEEE Signal Processing Society.
- 2022: Doctor Honoris Causa from the University of Brasília.
