= AT&T Internet =

Broadband internet service

- Type: Division
- Industry: Telecommunications
- Founded: September 19, 2016; 10 years ago
- Areas served: Select US States
- Services: Broadband internet
- Parent: AT&T Communications
- Website: www.att.com/internet/

AT&T Internet is an AT&T brand of broadband internet service. Previously, AT&T Internet was branded as U-verse Internet and bundled with U-verse TV, which was spun off into the newly independent DirecTV in 2021. AT&T Internet plans powered by fiber-optic cable use the AT&T Fiber brand.

== Services ==
AT&T delivers most internet service over a fiber-to-the-node (FTTN) or fiber-to-the-premises (FTTP) communications network. In the more common FTTN deployment, fiber-optic connections carry all data (internet, IPTV, and voice over IP) between the service provider and a distribution node. The remaining run from the node to the network interface device in the customer's home uses a copper-wire current loop that is traditionally part of the PSTN (public switched telephone network). In more recently constructed housing developments, AT&T uses an FTTP deployment—they run fiber-optic cable from their DSLAM all the way to an optical network terminal in the customer's home.

In areas where AT&T deploys internet through FTTN, they use High-speed digital subscriber lines with ADSL2+ or VDSL technology. Service offerings depend on the customer's distance to an available port in the distribution node, or the central office.

In so-called "fringe" areas, AT&T provides High Speed Internet through IP-DSLAM ADSL2+, which does not require pair bonding or a VRAD and operates at slower bitrates than pair-bonded VDSL2. In practice, VRADs are not installed in many older urban neighborhoods as AT&T prepares to abandon the fixed-line broadband market. AT&T Internet provides internet access to computers connected on-premises via Ethernet cabling or Wi-Fi from the included residential gateway or DSL modem.

AT&T Fiber, or as it is known AT&T Internet powered by Fiber, provides fiber to the home (FTTH) service in select markets. Historically a form of AT&T Fiber Internet launched in the fall of 2013 branded as GigaPower, and bundled with U-verse TV as "U-verse with GigaPower".

Basic, Express, Pro, Elite and Max (VDSL) are usually available for self-installation. Max (ADSL2+), Max Plus, and Max Turbo can be self-installed if only one jack is connected for DSL (through a splitter installed by a technician), or splitter-free if no landline shares the pair. Conditions where higher speeds are still attainable through filters or quality wiring to more than one jack occur less often.

AT&T announced Internet 45 service (formerly "Power") on August 26, 2013. Internet 45 required two conditioned line pairs (pair bond) and a Motorola NVG589 VDSL2+ Gateway. AT&T charges a service fee to condition and pair bond the lines and install a new gateway, plus additional monthly charges.

Name	Download Speed (up to)	Upload Speed (up to)	Connection	Notes
Internet Basic 5	5 Mbit/s	1 Mbit/s	VDSL or ADSL2+	Upload speeds up to 768 kbit/s with ADSL2+
Internet 10	10 Mbit/s	1 Mbit/s	VDSL or ADSL2+	Upload speeds up to 1 Mbit/s with ADSL2+
Internet 25	25 Mbit/s	5 Mbit/s	VDSL2	
Internet 50	50 Mbit/s	10 Mbit/s	VDSL2	Select markets (requires VDSL2 pair-bonding or 17 MHz)
Internet 75	75 Mbit/s	20 Mbit/s	VDSL2	Select markets (requires VDSL2 pair-bonding and 17 MHz)
Internet 100	100 Mbit/s	20 Mbit/s	VDSL2	Select markets (requires VDSL2 pair-bonding and 17 MHz)
Internet 300	300 Mbit/s	300 Mbit/s	GPON or XGS-PON	
Internet 500	500 Mbit/s	500 Mbit/s	GPON or XGS-PON	
Internet 1000	1000 Mbit/s	1000 Mbit/s	GPON or XGS-PON	
Internet 2000	2000 Mbit/s	2000 Mbit/s	XGS-PON	
Internet 5000	5000 Mbit/s	5000 Mbit/s	XGS-PON	

=== Business internet ===
AT&T Business Internet (ATTBI) is a provider of Internet access and services. ATTBI provides local access. It is available in 59 countries. Extended access features allow users to reach 147 additional countries.

ATTBI provides DSL services with speeds ranging from 25 to 500 Mbit/s, and fiber-optic services at up to 1 Gbit/s.

== Equipment ==
=== Line equipment ===
AT&T Internet uses the Alcatel-Lucent 7330 or 7340 Intelligent Services Access Manager (ISAM) shelf, also called a video-ready access device (VRAD), deployed either in a central office (CO) or to a neighborhood serving area interface (SAI). These models are both composed of circuit boards providing service, which are fed by fiber. FTTN (fiber to the node) systems use model 7330, which uses existing copper wiring to customers' homes, leading to distance limitations from the VRAD cabinet to the customer's home. The 7330 ISAM is an internet protocol DSL access multiplexer that supports VDSL and ADSL protocols. FTTP (fiber to the premises) systems use model 7340, mostly in areas such as new neighborhoods or large housing developments, where AT&T chooses to run fiber to the household, removing the distance limitations of copper. The 7340 then connects to a serving area interface, which distributes service to homes in the neighborhood, via a dual strand fiber, which then splits into 32 customer fiber pairs. The fiber pairs typically lead to a customer's residence at the network interface device.

The VRAD typically connects upstream to an Alcatel-Lucent 7450 Ethernet service switch in the central office hub, then to the headend video hub office.

=== Customer equipment ===
AT&T provides the customer premises equipment (leased for a monthly fee, or purchased with a 1-year warranty), and includes a wireless router and modem, which they call a residential gateway (RG) or internet gateway. They also provide TV receivers made by Cisco (through Scientific Atlanta) and Arris (from the former Motorola cable division) (including standard receivers, wireless receivers, and DVR receivers).

Those eligible for triple play (TV, Internet, and Phone) will use a VDSL2 transport link which uses one of the following modems:

- 2Wire 3600 (Deprecated)
- 2Wire 3800 (Deprecated)
- 2Wire 3801
- Pace 5031NV
- 2Wire iNID (which comes with the 2Wire i3812V for the outside unit, the iPSU (Intelligent Power Supply Unit) which powers the i3812V, and one or more i38HG for internet access via wireless or Ethernet connectivity inside the customer premises) (Deprecated)
- Arris NVG589
- Arris NVG599
- Pace 5268AC
- Arris BGW210

Along with the modems above, those eligible for fiber-to-the-home may have additional routers that could be used:

- Nokia BGW320 (Integrated ONT utilizing a SFP transceiver to provide optics) also has a standard ONT port

Those who are eligible for double play (Internet and Phone) only, and aren't serviced by fiber-to-the-home, will use an ADSL2+ transport type which uses one of the following modems:

- 2Wire 2701HGV-B (the model number must contain a "V", otherwise it will not function with the AT&T Internet platform) (Deprecated)
- Motorola 2210-02-1ATT (the AT&T Internet version of the 2210 and is black; the silver version is for PPPoE and not 802.1x) (Deprecated)
- Motorola NVG510
- Pace 5168NV (Only RG that can support VOIP on a 1.5 Mbit/s profile and support bonded ADSL+2)

Currently four devices support bonded pair: the 2Wire iNID, Arris NVG589 and NVG599, and Pace 5268AC. The Motorola NVG589 originally replaced the 2Wire iNID for all bonded pair installs. The NVG599 and 5268AC both have replaced the NVG589 and are used interchangeably. These three devices are capable of both ADSL2+ and VDSL.

All AT&T Internet transport types use 802.1X authentication. This means only equipment on AT&T's approved list works with the AT&T Internet service, as non-AT&T equipment cannot officially authenticate with AT&T's ADSL2+/VDSL2 DSLAMs and GPON/XGS-PON ONTs. Another side-effect of AT&T Internet's authentication protocol is the lack of bridge mode support (unlike standard DSL that uses PPPoE authentication, which is easily bridgeable). At best, 2Wire/Pace routers support DMZ+ mode, while Motorola/Arris devices support IP Passthrough. AT&T allows residential and business customers to pay for static IP addresses, which they support on all AT&T approved equipment (including the 2Wire/Pace and Motorola routers).

Some users on GPON and XGS-PON have unofficially replaced AT&T's router by bridging 802.1X packets from one, extracting the 802.1X certificates from one and implanting them on a third-party router, or using a third-party ONT by "cloning" the AT&T-provided ONT with its serial number and MAC address to an aftermarket unit. With this method, the third-party router is directly connected to AT&T's network, bypassing the NAT table of an AT&T gateway, and based on the method used, mimicking and/or disabling 802.1X authentication on third-party equipment. This allows AT&T users to have third-party router experience comparable to other ISPs such as cable ISPs, PPPoE-based ISPs, Verizon Fios and Google Fiber, albeit with extra steps and/or equipment.

When AT&T launched IP-DSL (ADSL2+, double play only), they installed connections with either the 2Wire 2701HGV-B or Motorola 2210 (pairing the latter with a Cisco Linksys E1000 for residential customers, or an EdgeMarc 250AEW for business customers). The 2Wire 2701HGV-B was limited to a top speed of 6 Mbit/s, while the Motorola 2210 was capable of higher speeds. In later installations, AT&T standardized on the Motorola NVG510, phasing out the other routers for new service installation.

When AT&T introduced the Internet 45 tier in 2013, installations were initially done with the iNID. AT&T later standardized on the Motorola NVG589, which supports pair-bonding for both ADSL2+ and VDSL2. AT&T also uses the NVG589 in some installations where the customer otherwise is too far from a node for service. Additionally, it supports an internal battery for those who subscribe to AT&T Phone service for battery backup during power failures. AT&T no longer supplies the battery to customers for any residential service.

Device	Transport Type	Static IP	Wireless Support	Bridge Mode Type
2Wire 3600/3800/3801	VDSL2; ONT	Yes	802.11b/g	DMZ+
2Wire 5031NV	VDSL2; Also known to work on ADSL2+	Yes	802.11b/g 802.11n	DMZ+
2Wire 270HGV-B	ADSL2+	Yes	802.11b/g	DMZ+
2Wire iNID	VDSL2 Bonded Pair	Yes	802.11b/g	DMZ+
Motorola NVG510	ADSL2+	Yes	802.11b/g 802.11n	IP Passthrough
Arris NVG589	ADSL2+ VDSL2; ADSL2+ Bonded Pair; VDSL2 Bonded Pair; ONT	Yes	802.11b/g 802.11n	IP Passthrough
Arris NVG599	ADSL2+ VDSL2; ADSL2+ Bonded Pair; VDSL2 Bonded Pair; ONT	Yes	802.11b/g Dual-Band 802.11n(2x2)/AC(3x3)	IP Passthrough
Motorola 2210	ADSL2+	No	None	IP Passthrough
Pace 5268AC	ADSL2+ VDSL2; ADSL2+ Bonded Pair; VDSL2 Bonded Pair; ONT	Yes	802.11b/g Dual-Band 802.11n(2x2)/AC(4x4)	DMZ+
Arris BGW210	ADSL2+ VDSL2; ADSL2+ Bonded Pair; VDSL2 Bonded Pair; ONT	Yes	802.11b/g Dual-Band 802.11n(3x3)/AC(4x4)	IP Passthrough

== History ==
=== Worldnet ===
AT&T Worldnet, a dial-up Internet access service, was launched in 1996 to compete with AOL.

As of 2007, AT&T Internet Services was a trade name for five companies owned by AT&T that provided Internet service under the AT&T Yahoo! name:

- Ameritech Interactive Media Services (ameritech.net)
- Pacific Bell Internet Services, comprising Pacific Bell (pacbell.net) and Nevada Bell (nvbell.net)
- Prodigy, which had been acquired by SBC in 2001 (prodigy.net)
- SNET Diversified Group for customers located within Connecticut. Following AT&T's announcement that it would sell Southern New England Telephone and SNET America to Frontier Communications, SNET Diversified Group was merged into AT&T Corp.
- Southwestern Bell Internet Services (swbell.net, sbcglobal.net)

As of 2008, BellSouth Telecommunications (bellsouth.net) also provided AT&T FastAccess Internet service in the Southeastern United States. AT&T assigned the att.net domain and AT&T Yahoo! Internet service in the AT&T Southeast (BellSouth) Region.

New e-mail addresses from these companies typically ended in "att.net", with older addresses retaining the domains assigned to them by e-mail services provided by Maillennium, a system developed by AT&T Labs.

In 2010, AT&T announced the migration of all former Worldnet-based accounts to AT&T Dial, AT&T High Speed Internet, AT&T Pre-Paid Internet or a standalone portal or e-mail service. Between April 5 and April 15, 2010, all WorldNet accounts that had not been migrated were suspended.

AT&T Dial services were terminated in November 2020.

AT&T Worldnet logo (1996–1999)

AT&T Worldnet logo (1999–2006)

AT&T Worldnet logo (2006–2007)

=== U-verse ===
AT&T U-verse
- Type: Subsidiary
- Industry: Telecommunications
- Founded: June 26, 2006; 20 years ago
- Fate: Split into three separate brands; AT&T Phone; AT&T Internet (AT&T Fiber); U-verse TV
- Areas served: Select US States
- Services: Broadband Internet; Phone; Television
- Parent: AT&T Communications

AT&T U-verse, commonly called U-verse, was the AT&T brand of triple-play telecommunications services, including broadband Internet, IP telephone, and IPTV services in 22 states.

SBC Communications announced its plans for a fiber-optic network and Internet Protocol television (IPTV) deployment in 2004 and unveiled the name "U-verse" (formerly "Project Lightspeed") for the suite of network services in 2005. SBC eventually became AT&T in late 2005, and the AT&T name was applied for the service.

Beta testing began in San Antonio in 2005 and AT&T U-verse was commercially launched June 26, 2006, in San Antonio. A few months later on November 30, 2006, the service was launched in Houston. In December 2006, the product launched in Chicago, San Francisco, Oakland, Hartford, Indianapolis, and other cities in their vicinities. In February 2007, U-verse was launched in Milwaukee. One month later, service was initiated in Dallas and Kansas City. In May 2007, U-verse launched in Detroit, Los Angeles, and surrounding areas. Launch continued in Cleveland, Akron, and San Diego in June 2007. The Oklahoma City and Sacramento launches occurred in August 2007. In November 2007, service was started in Austin. In December 2007, U-verse was launched in Orlando and St. Louis. A controlled launch was also initiated in Atlanta that month marking the first launch in the Southeastern United States. On November 24, 2008, U-verse launched in Charlotte On December 22, 2008, the product debuted in Birmingham. On January 25, 2010, AT&T announced that U-verse was available to over 2.8 million households.

AT&T U-verse Voice was added on January 22, 2008, and was first available in Detroit. In 2008, U-verse availability approached 8 million households and over 225,000 customers had been enrolled, with new installations reaching 12,000 per week. By 2009, 1 million Phone customers and 2.1 million U-verse TV customers had been enrolled.

AT&T announced Internet 18 service (then called "Max 18") in November 2008, and Internet 24 (then called "Max Turbo") was announced in December 2009.

On May 2, 2011, all DSL customers of AT&T became subject to a monthly use cap of 150 GB. The company began sending users notice of the change in Terms of Service on March 18, 2011. The plan for charging when a user exceeds the limit was to begin doing so if the account exceeds the limit three times over the life of the account, and the charge would be $10 for every 50 GB of overuse for DSL users.

At the end of 2011, U-verse was available to more than 30 million living units in 22 states and U-verse TV had 3.8 million customers. By mid-2012, AT&T had 4.1 million U-Verse TV subscribers, 2.6 million Phone subscribers, and 6.5 million Internet subscribers.

By the third quarter of 2012, AT&T had 4.3 million TV subscribers, 2.7 million Phone subscribers and 7.1 million Internet. This represents 7% growth quarter on quarter. The actual number of customers is lower, as most customers subscribe to a bundle (such as TV and Phone) and so are counted in both categories.

At an analyst meeting in August 2015, following AT&T's acquisition of satellite provider DirecTV, AT&T announced plans for a new "home entertainment gateway" platform that will converge DirecTV and U-verse around a common platform based upon DirecTV hardware with "very thin hardware profiles". AT&T Entertainment and Internet Services CEO John Stankey explained that the new platform would offer "single truck roll installation for multiple products, live local streaming, improved content portability, over-the-top integration for mobile broadband, and user interface re-engineering."

In February 2016, Bloomberg reported that AT&T was in the process of phasing out the U-verse IPTV service by encouraging new customers to purchase DirecTV satellite service instead, and by ending the production of new set-top boxes for the service. An AT&T spokesperson denied that U-verse was being shut down and explained that the company was "leading its video marketing approach with DirecTV" to "realize the many benefits" of the purchase, but would still recommend U-verse TV if it better-suited a customer's needs. AT&T CFO John Stephens had also previously stated that DirecTV's larger subscriber base as a national service gave the service a higher degree of leverage in negotiating carriage deals, thus resulting in lower content costs.

On March 29, 2016, AT&T announced that it would increase data caps on its Internet service on May 23, 2016.

On May 16, 2016, AT&T acquired Quickplay Media, a cloud-based platform that powers over-the-top video services.

=== AT&T Internet ===
On September 19, 2016, AT&T announced that the "U-verse" brand would no longer apply to its broadband and VoIP phone services, renaming them "AT&T Internet" and "AT&T Phone", respectively, while the AT&T U-verse TV brand was maintained. AT&T adopted "AT&T Fiber" as the new brand name for its fiber-based internet service, with the "AT&T Internet" brand continuing to be used for its DSL internet service.

In 2014, it launched AT&T Fiber in Austin, Texas with 300 Mbit/s speeds, but as of 2014 top download speeds have increased to 1 Gbit/s (1000 Mbit/s). In 2019, AT&T rolled out 100% Fiber Network Powered by AT&T Fiber Live in 84 Metro areas.

In selected markets, AT&T began to replace AT&T U-verse TV with a new service based on its DirecTV Now platform, AT&T TV, in August 2019. On April 3, 2020, AT&T began announcing that U-verse TV would no longer be available to new customers. New customers ended up receiving AT&T TV for TV service. However, by September 2020 AT&T spokesman Ryan Oliver, when asked if AT&T was still selling U-verse, said that “U-verse is available in select locations,” and "AT&T never stopped selling U-verse", even though an AT&T customer attempted to order U-verse, but ended up receiving 2 boxes of AT&T TV instead.

In October 2020, the company stopped selling new DSL connections, saying that "We’re beginning to phase out outdated services like DSL ..." As of mid-2020, the company had about 650,000 total DSL connections. It continues to sell its hybrid-fiber service, sold as “AT&T Internet,” which combines fiber trunk lines with DSL last-mile connections for faster speeds. However, in many areas yet to get AT&T Fiber or outside of AT&T's wireline territory, AT&T Internet Air, a fixed wireless service was launched to provide faster speeds than what VDSL2 can provide. Internet Air competes with similar offerings from T-Mobile, Starry Internet and Verizon.

On August 2, 2021, the spinoff of DirecTV was completed. AT&T TV (which became DirecTV Stream) and U-verse TV are now wholly owned services of DirecTV.

== Web portal ==
Currently from AT&T
- Website type: Web Portal
- Owner: AT&T
- Website: https://currently.att.yahoo.com/
- Launched: 1996; 30 years ago

AT&T created att.net as a web portal in 1995 in support of AT&T Worldnet.

Following the acquisition of AT&T by SBC Communications in 2005, and the subsequent acquisition of BellSouth, the purpose of the att.net portal widened: it was made to serve as the portal not only for Worldnet customers, but also for customers of BellSouth Dial and BellSouth DSL, as well as for all AT&T ISP customers in the SBC territory who had not elected to use the SBC Yahoo! portal.

On January 30, 2008, AT&T announced that it would end a longtime partnership with Google for my.att.net and instead would begin to offer services provided by Yahoo! beginning in the second quarter of 2008 for all AT&T Internet Services customers. On April 2, 2008, the new att.net powered by Yahoo! was launched. AT&T began migrating customers off the old Worldnet portal and onto the Powered by Yahoo! portal in December 2008, and the final migrations were completed in May 2010. In an effort to make the most of the relationship with Yahoo! and to simplify its offerings, AT&T determined that it would close the historical, internally developed portal at att.net. All AT&T ISP customers were provisioned with AT&T-branded accounts on the Yahoo! portal and with Yahoo! premium-level e-mail accounts, and att.net became the web address for this unified portal.

On May 4, 2016, AT&T announced that it had entered into a new contract with Synacor for the company to take over the majority of its in-house internet services. AT&T stated that Yahoo would still provide email services for its customers, but effective June 30, 2017, AT&T e-mail accounts would no longer automatically function as Yahoo accounts.

However, the deal was ended in 2019, and the contract was awarded to Verizon Communications, which had purchased Yahoo! in 2017. The "Currently from AT&T" branding was introduced at this time.
