= Anil K. Jain (electrical engineer, born 1946) =

Indian-American electrical engineer (1946–1988)

Anil K. Jain (January 21, 1946 – November 14, 1988) was an Indian-American electrical engineer and Professor of the Department of Electrical Engineering and Computer Science at the University of California, Davis, known for his contributions on "two-dimensional stochastic models for images provid[ing] a firm theoretical foundation for a number of algorithms of spectral analysis, adaptive image estimation and image data compression", including work on transform coding for image compression and block-based motion compensation for video compression in particular.

== Biography ==
Born in India, Jain received a bachelor's degree in electrical engineering in 1967 at the IIT Kharagpur and a master's degree in 1969 and Ph.D. in 1970 from the University of Rochester. He had conducted his doctoral research at the University of Southern California under guidance of Richard Bellman.

After graduation Jain continued as postdoctoral fellow and later assistant professor in the department of Electrical Engineering and in the Image Processing Institute of the University of Southern California. In 1974 he joined the faculty of the State University of New York at Buffalo, and in 1978 he returned to California and became a professor at the University of California, Davis.

In 1983 Jain received the IEEE Donald G. Fink Prize Paper Award.

In 1988 Jain was recognized as a Fellow of the IEEE. He died of a heart attack that same year on November 14, at the age of 42.

== Work ==
Jain's research interests ranged from "digital and image processing, computer vision, fast algorithms, real time digital systems architecture to stochastic processes and communication theory."

=== Image processing textbook ===
Jain wrote an influential textbook, Fundamentals of Image Processing, published in 1988 by Prentice Hall (ISBN 978-0133361650).

=== Video compression ===
Anil K. Jain was a contributor to the field of motion video compression. With his colleague Jaswant R. Jain, Anil published the original paper combining block-based motion compensation and transform coding in December 1981.

Subsequently, most of the video compression standards for two-way communications and video broadcast applications were based upon motion compensation and transform coding, including those most widely used today such as MPEG-1, MPEG-2 (used on DVDs) and the most common Internet video H.264/MPEG-4 AVC.

=== Optivision and its transform coding products ===
While at University of California, Davis, Jain co-founded Optivision, Inc. in the mid-1980s with Professor Joseph Goodman from Stanford. Optivision pioneered both JPEG transform coding products for picture capture systems such as for the California Department of Motor Vehicles, and video compression systems such as videoconferencing that used the block-based motion-compensated transform coding techniques he developed. Jain's work also inspired other video industry entrepreneurs such as Brian Hinman, co-founder of PictureTel, Polycom, and 2Wire. Optivision later, after Jain's untimely death, had an initial public offering primarily thanks to the Optivision optical switching technology.
