= G-PON encapsulation method =

Technology for Gigabit-capable Passive Optical Network

ITU-T G.984.3
- Gigabit-capable passive optical networks (G-PON) Transmission convergence layer specification: encapsulation method
- Abbreviation: GEM
- Status: Active
- Year started: 22 February 2004
- First published: 22 February 2004
- Latest version: 3.0; 13 January 2014
- Organization: International Telecommunication Union Telecommunication Standardization Sector
- Successor: XG-PON encapsulation method(XGEM) itu-t G.987.3
- Domain: Telecommunication
- License: Freely available
- Website: https://www.itu.int/rec/T-REC-G.984.3

G-PON Encapsulation Method (GEM) defined as part of ITU-T G.984.3 is the method used to package and transport diverse user-plane and management traffic such as Ethernet, TDM and OMCI messages over a Gigabit-capable Passive Optical Network. The encapsulation mechanism is defined as part of the GPON transmission convergence layer and uses the GEM to map variable-length client frames into GPON payload units for transport between an optical line termination (OLT) and optical network units/terminals (ONUs).

== Overview ==
The encapsulation objective is twofold:

1. Provide an efficient, flexible framing that carries multiple service types across a shared downstream/upstream medium
2. Support per-flow quality of service, fragmentation, and orderly reassembly.

GEM decouples client service formats from the underlying GPON framing so that Ethernet frames, ATM cells, or generic payloads can be carried transparently while the GPON transmission convergence (GTC) layer handles multiplexing, operation, administration and maintenance (OAM), synchronization and bandwidth allocation.

== Frame structure of GEM frame ==
Layer	Payload length indicator (PLI)	Port ID	Payload type indicator (PTI)	Header Error Control (HEC)	Fragment payload
Length (bits)	12 (0-4095 x Bytes)	12 (0-4095 )	3	13	Varries

Payload length indicator (PLI): 12 bits
Indicates the length of the GEM payload in bytes (up to 4095 bytes).
Port-ID: 12 bits
Identifies the logical GEM port associated with a specific service flow or traffic stream.
Payload type indicator (PTI): 3 bits
Indicates the payload type "User data" or "GEM OAM", and fragmentation status of the frame.
Header Error Control (HEC): 13 bits
Error detection and correction field used to protect the GEM header.

PTI code	Meaning
000	User data fragment, not the end of a frame
001	User data fragment, end of a frame
010	Reserved
011	Reserved
100	GEM OAM, not the end of a frame
101	GEM OAM, end of a frame
110	Reserved
110	Reserved

== Transport of user traffic over GEM ==
Depending on Service type selected for the GEM Port-ID, both OTL and ONU know how to handle the payload, and can save bandwidth by not encapsulation Ethernet. The GEM model is placed in layer 2.

GPON layering, OSI model
OSI-Layer		Examples				
5+	Application	Various service	T1/E1	DATA	DATA	
4	Transport	❚	❚	DATA	TCP/UDP/QUIC	
3	Network	❚	❚	DATA	IP	
2	Data Link	❚	❚	MPLS	❚	Ethernet
2	Data Link	ATM cell	GEM frame			
2	Data Link	GTC frame				
1	Physical	PON-PHY				

=== Multiprotocol Label Switching ===
MPLS packets are carried directly in GEM payloads; an MPLS packet (or fragment) maps to one or more GEM frames according to the general fragmentation rules, a GEM frame shall carry no more than one MPLS packet (or MPLS fragment).

MPLS over GEM
GEM Header	MPLS				
GEM Header	Lable	EXP	S	TTL	Payload

=== IP packets ===
IP packets are carried directly in GEM payloads; an IP packet (or fragment) maps to one or more GEM frames according to the general fragmentation rules, a GEM frame shall carry no more than one IP packet (or IP fragment). To make Ethernet work proxy ARP is used, for upstream/downstream devices.

IP over GEM
GEM Header	IP packet												
GEM Header	V	HL	TOS	Length	Id	FL	Frag. off	TTL	PORT	CRC	Source Address	Destination Address	Payload

=== Ethernet ===
Ethernet is directly mapped on GEM packet, only Ethernet layer 2 packets are used, layer 1 part (Preamble, Start frame delimiter, Interpacket gap) is not generated.

Ethernet over GEM
GEM Header	Ethernet Packet				
GEM Header	Destination Address	Source Address	Length/type	Payload	Frame check sequence
