= Acha =

Acha or ACHA may refer to:

- Acha, Coll, Scottish village
- Acha (doll), a character in Namco's 1986 arcade game, Toy Pop
- Acha (name), list of people with the name
- Acha Mountain Fortress, an earthen fortress
- General Acha, town in La Pampa Province, Argentina
- Acha (阿差; āchā), a Cantonese ethnic slur for a South Asian or Indian person
- American College Health Association
- American Collegiate Hockey Association
- A name for Digitaria exilis, a grass, a species of fonio
- Applied and Computational Harmonic Analysis, a scientific journal

== See also ==
- Acha Dhin, a 2015 Indian Malayalam-language film
