= Collision avoidance =

Collision avoidance may refer to:

- Collision avoidance in transportation
- Collision avoidance (networking)
