= David H. Staelin =

American astronomer and engineer

David Hudson Staelin
- Born: 1938
- Died: 2011 (aged 72–73)
- Scientific career
- Fields: Astronomy, electrical engineering, remote sensing
- Institutions: Massachusetts Institute of Technology; MIT Lincoln Laboratory

David Hudson Staelin (1938 – 2011) was an American astronomer, engineer, and entrepreneur. He co-discovered the Crab nebula pulsar in 1968, and was Principal Investigator for earth-remote-sensing satellite instruments. He was a co-founder of Environmental Research and Technology, Inc. and the founding chairman of PictureTel Corp., one of the first videoconferencing firms.

== Early life and education ==
Staelin grew up in Ottawa Hills, Ohio, a suburb of Toledo. He was the oldest of four children in his family. After graduating from Ottawa Hills High School, he enrolled at the Massachusetts Institute of Technology (MIT) and received a Bachelor of Science degree in electrical engineering in 1960, then a Master of Science degree in 1961 and Doctor of Science degree in electrical engineering in 1965, all from MIT.

== Career ==
That same year (1965) he joined the faculty of the Electrical Engineering and Computer Science department and the radio astronomy group of the Research Laboratory of Electronics at MIT. He remained on the faculty at MIT for the rest of his life. He also served as an assistant director of MIT Lincoln Laboratory from 1990 to 2001. From 2003 to 2005, he was a member of the U.S. President's Information Technology Advisory Committee.

While on leave at the National Radio Astronomy Observatory in 1968, Staelin developed the computationally efficient fast folding algorithm for detection of periodic signals, which enabled him and Edward C. Reifenstein III to find two pulsars in the vicinity of the Crab Nebula, which were close enough to it (given the angular resolution of the antenna) to potentially be associated with it. One of these, NP 0532, was subsequently determined to be at the center of the nebula. The first astronomical pulsar had been discovered by Jocelyn Bell Burnell and Antony Hewish in 1967, but the origin of such pulsating radio signals had not yet been established. The association of a pulsar with the Crab Nebula, which was known to be the remnant of a supernova, supported the hypothesis that pulsars are rotating neutron stars, and provided observational evidence that a neutron star could result from a supernova explosion.

He proposed two microwave spectrometers for remote-sensing of the Earth, which were flown on the Nimbus 5 and Nimbus 6 satellites, respectively. These experimental instruments could measure atmospheric temperature profiles even in the presence of clouds that blocked the view of infrared instruments, and they were forerunners of subsequent microwave atmospheric sounding instruments (MSU, AMSU, ATMS) on NOAA and EUMETSAT weather satellites.

In 1968 Staelin and Norman E. Gaut founded Environmental Research and Technology, Inc. (acquired by AECOM in 1979), a company which specialized in air-quality measurements and became "one of the largest air quality monitoring sources in the world". In the 1980s Staelin began to investigate videoconferencing as an alternative to travel. An outgrowth of his research in this area was the founding in 1984 of PicTel Corporation (renamed PictureTel Corp. in 1987; acquired by Polycom in 2001), by Staelin and his former students Brian Hinman and Jeffrey G. Bernstein.

He was a co-investigator for the Planetary Radio Astronomy instrument on the Voyager 1 and Voyager 2 missions to Jupiter, Saturn, Uranus and Neptune, and a member of the science team for the Atmospheric Infrared Sounder on NASA's Aqua satellite.

== Personal life ==
He had two brothers, Earl and Stephen Staelin and a sister, Mimi Ferrell. He married Ellen Mahoney, and they had three children, Carl, Katharine and Paul.

== Honors and awards ==
- Fellow of the American Association for the Advancement of Science
- Fellow of the Institute of Electrical and Electronics Engineers (IEEE)
- 1996 Distinguished Achievement Award of the IEEE Geoscience and Remote Sensing Society
- 2011 John Howard Dellinger Medal of the International Union of Radio Science

== Books ==
- Staelin, D. H.; Morgenthaler, A. W.; and Kong, J. A. (1993), Electromagnetic Waves (Prentice-Hall) ISBN 0-13-225871-4
- Staelin, D. H. and Staelin, C. H. (2011), Models for Neural Spike Computation and Cognition, (www.cognon.net) ISBN 9781466472228
