= Azha =

Azha may refer to:

- Eta Eridani or Azha, a star in the constellation Eridanus
- Tuyuhun or Azha, a former kingdom in China
- Azha language, a Sino-Tibetan language spoken by the Yi people of China
- Eid-ul-Azha, Islamic religious holiday at the end of hajj

== See also ==
- Acha (disambiguation)
- Azhar (disambiguation)
