= Fiber-optic splitter =

Quartz substrate of an integrated waveguide optical power distribution device

A fiber-optic splitter, also known as a beam splitter, is based on a quartz substrate of an integrated waveguide optical power distribution device, similar to a coaxial cable transmission system. The optical network system uses an optical signal coupled to the branch distribution. The fiber optic splitter is one of the most important passive devices in the optical fiber link. It is an optical fiber tandem device with many input and output terminals, especially applicable to a passive optical network (EPON, GPON, BPON, FTTX, FTTH etc.) to connect the main distribution frame and the terminal equipment and to branch the optical signal.

== Types ==
According to the principle, fiber optic splitters can be divided into Fused Biconical Taper (FBT) splitter and Planar Lightwave Circuit (PLC) splitters.

The FBT splitter is one of the most common. FBT splitters are widely accepted and used in passive networks, especially for instances where the split configuration is smaller (1×2, 1×4, 2×2, etc.).

The PLC is a more recent technology. PLC splitters offer a better solution for larger applications. Waveguides are fabricated using lithography onto a silica glass substrate, which allows for routing specific percentages of light. As a result, PLC splitters offer accurate and even splits with minimal loss in an efficient package.

=== Balanced splitters ===
Balanced (2xN) splitters consists of 2 input fibers and N output fibers which divide the power of the optical signal proportionally. They are mainly used for non-simultaneous redundancy.

== Splitting ratio principle ==
Wave splitting involves dividing a light beam into multiple streams. The daughter streams can be equal or in some other ratio.

The FBT splitter uses two (or more) fibers. The fibers' coating layer is removed. Both fibers, at the same time, are stretched under a heating zone thus forming a double cone. This special waveguide structure allows control of the splitting ratio via controlling length of the fiber torsion angle and stretch.

The PLC splitter is a micro-optical element using photolithographic techniques to form optical waveguide at medium or semiconductor substrate for realizing branch distribution function. For example, graded-index silica-glass waveguides could be used to fabricate PLC optical splitters, and the splitting ratio can be simply adjusted during the design and fabrication phases.

== Advantages and disadvantages ==
- The FBT splitter offers low cost, common materials (quartz substrate, stainless steel, fiber, hot dorm, GEL), and an adjustable splitting ratio. However, its losses are wavelength-dependent and it offers poor spectral uniformity, cannot ensure uniform spectroscopy, and is temperature sensitive.
- PLC splitter: Losses are not sensitive to the wavelength, spectral uniformity is higher and it is more compact and has lower cost with greater degrees of splitting. However, device fabrication process is more complex.

== See also ==
- Optical fiber
- Optical fiber connector
- Fiber-optic communication
- Optical fiber cable
- Fiber optic patch cord
- Telecommunications Industry Association
- Fiber
- Splitter ADSL
