= Polycom VSX 7000 =

Videoconferencing system made by Polycom

VSX 7000
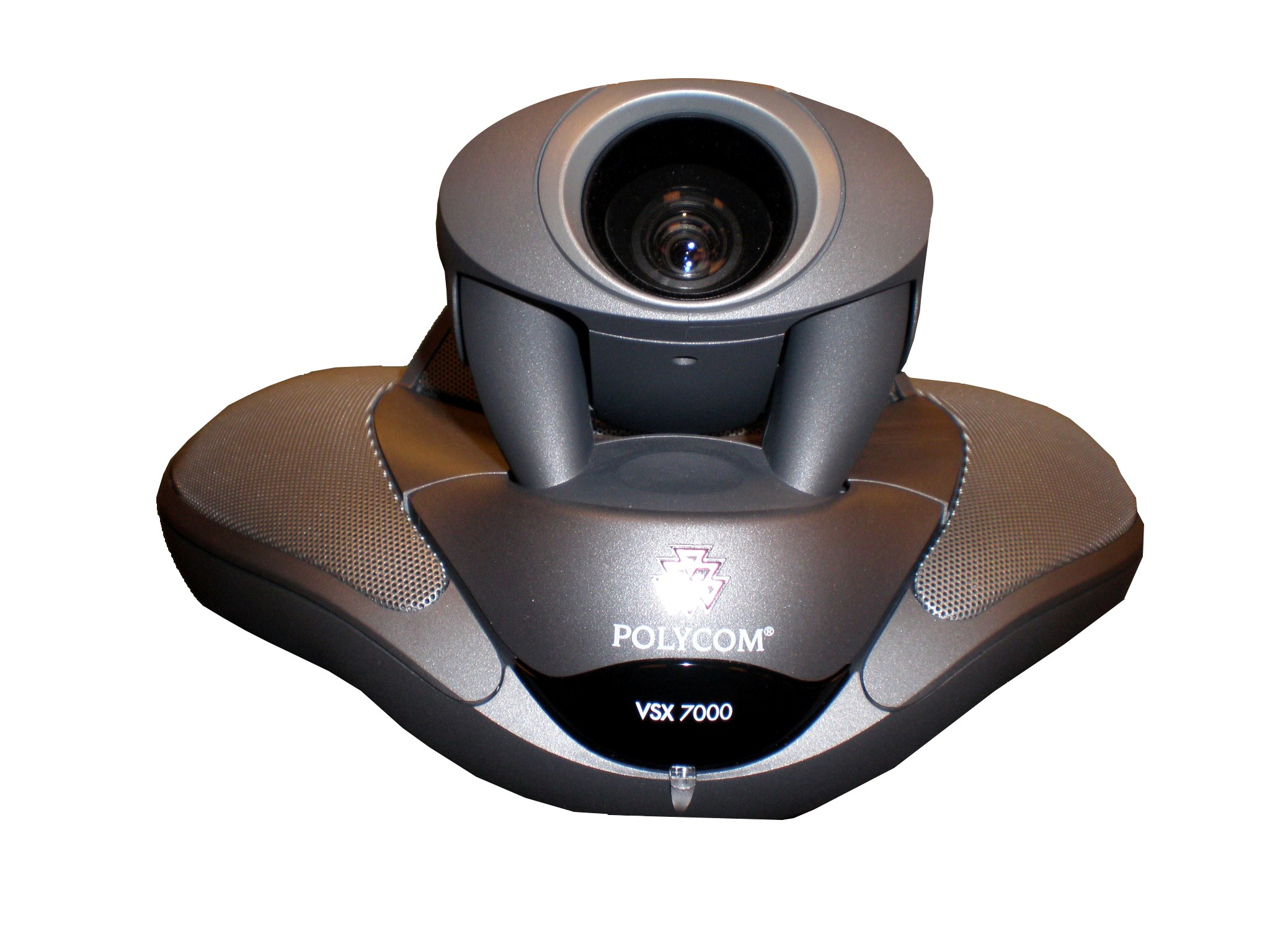
- Manufacturer: Polycom
- Successor: Polycom VSX 7000s
- Rear camera: 65° field of view, 12× zoom, 30 frames/sec, FECC
- Display: External, not included in the unit
- Connectivity: IP (up to 2 Mbit/s), ISDN (up to 512 kbit/s)

The VSX 7000 is a videoconferencing system made by Polycom.

The Polycom VSX 7000 was introduced in October 2003. The system features CD quality audio, TV-quality video, and an integrated MCU unit capable of mixed-network multipoint capability for up to four sites.

The camera is connected to the Polycom VSX 7000 via a S-Video cable.

The VSX 7000 was intended for medium-sized conference rooms, and generally received positive reviews.

The system was superseded by the Polycom VSX7000s in 2005. Support from Polycom for this system ended at December 31, 2010.
