= Acha (name) =

Acha (also Achá) can be both a given name and surname. Notable people with the name include:

== As a given name ==
- Acha (archbishop of Esztergom) (11th century), Hungarian prelate
- Acha of Deira (6th–7th century), Anglian princess
- Acha Septriasa (born 1989), Indonesian actress and singer
- Lady Acha no Tsubone (1555–1637), Japanese noblewoman and diplomat

== As a surname ==
- Alberto Achá (1917–1965), Bolivian football defender
- Alexander Acha (born 1985), Mexican singer-songwriter
- Alejandro Acha (1878–1917), Spanish footballer
- Eduardo de Acha (1878–1928), Spanish soldier and footballer
- José Aguirre de Achá (born 1877), Bolivian writer, politician and lawyer
- José María Acha (1889–1929), Spanish footballer and lawyer
- José María de Achá (1810–1868), Bolivian military general and president of Bolivia
- Mariano Acha (1799–1841), soldier who fought in the Argentine Civil War
- Omar Acha (born 1971), Argentine historian and political essayist
- Pablo Acha (born 1996), Spanish archer
- Desi Arnaz (1917–1986), full name Desiderio Alberto Arnaz y de Acha III, a Cuban-American actor, musician, producer, and bandleader
