= Intelligent Network Interface Device =

An Intelligent Network Interface Device, more commonly known as an "INID", is a system that provides triple play media services to customer homes. The system provides digital subscriber line access, advanced TV, and voice over internet protocol (VoIP) phone services to subscribed customers. The term may refer either to a standalone external residential gateway or to a system of multiple components that together provide RG functions. Models include the 2Wire HomePortal INID and the Entone Crescendo INID. AT&T's U-verse brand of services employs the 2Wire INID as an alternative residential gateway.

Unlike the traditional Network Interface Device (NID) that it replaces, an INID includes an outdoor unit that mounts to the side of the subscriber's home in a hardened, weather-resistant enclosure that is easily accessible by carrier technicians; it also can include an indoor unit and a battery backup.

By transferring intelligent gateway functions and all service and network terminations to the side of the house, the INID eliminates the need to bring DSL into the house, eliminating the signal loss typical of in-home wiring. The location at the side of the house also allows for an easy connection between the INID's integrated VoIP function and the home's existing phone wiring.

The outdoor location also provides carrier technicians with easy access to home coaxial cable wiring, which can be reused to distribute high-speed LAN technologies to video set-top boxes and other networked consumer devices throughout the home using HomePNA.
