= Ameritech Interactive Media Services =

Former subsidiary of AT&T

Ameritech Interactive Media Services, Inc. was a subsidiary of AT&T that provides AT&T Yahoo! branded Internet services to AT&T customers in Illinois, Indiana, Michigan, Ohio, and Wisconsin.

AIMS was acquired by SBC Communications, now AT&T, in 1999 during its acquisition of Ameritech.
