= G.988 =

ITU-T Recommendation

- ONU management and control interface (OMCI) specification
- Status: In force
- Year started: 2010
- Latest version: (03/20); March 2010
- Organization: ITU-T
- Related standards: G.984
- Domain: Telecommunication
- License: Freely available
- Website: https://www.itu.int/rec/T-REC-G.988

OMCI or ITU-T Recommendation G.988 defines a management and control interface for optical network units (ONU). It comprises one recommendation:

Recommendation ITU-T G.988 specifies the optical network unit (ONU) management and control interface (OMCI) for optical access networks.

Recommendation ITU-T G.988 specifies the managed entities (MEs) of a protocol-independent management information base (MIB) that models the exchange of information between an optical line termination (OLT) and an ONU. In addition, it covers the ONU management and control channel, protocol and detailed messages.

- G.988, ONU management and control interface (OMCI) specification, 2010.
