= Southwestern Bell Internet Services =

Company owned by AT&T

Logo, 1996-2001

Southwestern Bell Internet Services, Inc. was one of the companies owned by AT&T that provided AT&T Yahoo!-branded Internet services to customers located within Arkansas, Kansas, Missouri, Oklahoma, and Texas.

It now does business as AT&T Internet Services.
