= Omar Acha =

Argentine historian

Omar Acha (born July 1971 in Argentina) is an Argentine historian and political essayist. He is a researcher at the Consejo Nacional de Investigaciones Científicas y Técnicas and also at the Centro de Investigaciones Filosóficas (Argentina). He teaches Philosophy of History at the Universidad de Buenos Aires. He was also a member of the editorial board of Herramienta. Revista de Teoría y Crítica Marxista, published in Buenos Aires.

His main fields of expertise are Marxism, Socialism, Psychoanalysis, History, Peronism, Social History, Intellectual History

== Works ==
- El sexo de la historia. Intervenciones de género para una crítica antiesencialista de la historiografía, Buenos Aires, El Cielo por Asalto, 2000. 156 p. ISBN 987-9035-19-4.
- Cuerpos, géneros e identidades. Estudios de historia de género en Argentina (compilación junto a Paula Halperin), Buenos Aires, Ediciones del Signo, 2000, 308 p. ISBN 987-98166-1-7.
- Carta abierta a Mariano Grondona. Interpretación de una crisis argentina, Buenos Aires, Centro Cultural de la Cooperación, 2003.
- La trama profunda. Historia y vida en José Luis Romero, Buenos Aires, El Cielo por Asalto, 2005, 193 p. ISBN 987-9035-30-5.
- La nación futura. Rodolfo Puiggrós en las encrucijadas argentinas del siglo XX, Buenos Aires, Editorial Universitaria de Buenos Aires, 2006, 330 p. ISBN 950-23-1561-8.
- Freud y el problema de la historia, Buenos Aires, Prometeo Libros, 2007, 168 p. ISBN 978-987-574-167-6.
- La nueva generación intelectual. Incitaciones y ensayos, Buenos Aires, Herramienta Ediciones, 2008, 197 p. ISBN 978-987-22929-9-7.
- Las huelgas bancarias, de Perón a Frondizi (1945-1962). Contribución a la historia de las clases sociales en la Argentina, Buenos Aires, Ediciones del Centro Cultural de la Cooperación, 2008, 254 p. ISBN 978-987-24591-09.
- Historia crítica de la historiografía argentina. Vol. 1. Las izquierdas en el siglo XX, Buenos Aires, Prometeo Libros, 2009. 383 p. ISBN 978-987-574357-1.
- Inconsciente e historia después de Freud. Cruces entre psicoanálisis, historia y filosofía (compilación junto a Mauro S. Vallejo), Buenos Aires, Prometeo Libros, 2010, 286 p. ISBN 978-987-574-435-6.
- Los muchachos peronistas. Orígenes olvidados de la Juventud Peronista, 1945-1955, Buenos Aires, Planeta, 2011, 252 p. ISBN 978-950-49-2703-7.
- El hecho maldito. Conversaciones para otra historia del peronismo (en colaboración con Nicolás Quiroga), Rosario, Prohistoria Ediciones, 2012, 236 p. ISBN 978-987-1855-21-6.
- Un revisionismo histórico de izquierda. Y otros ensayos de política intelectual, Buenos Aires, Herramienta Ediciones, 2012, 206 p. ISBN 978-987-1505-30-2.
- Crónica sentimental de la Argentina peronista. Sexo, inconsciente y política, 1945-1955, Buenos Aires, Prometeo Libros, 2013, 409 p. ISBN 978-987-574-621-3.
- Cambiar de ideas. Cuatro tentativas sobre Oscar Terán, Buenos Aires, Prometeo Libros, 2017, 192 p. ISBN 978-987-574-869-9.
- Encrucijadas de psicoanálisis y marxismo. Ensayos sobre la abstracción social, Buenos Aires, Teseo, 2018, 176 p. ISBN 978-987-72-3174-8.
- La Argentina peronista. Una historia desde abajo (1945-1955), Buenos Aires, Red Editorial, 2019, 88 p. ISBN 978-987-86-1521-9.
- Marxismo e historia. Deconstrucción y reconstrucción del materialismo histórico, Buenos Aires, Prometeo Libros, 2023, 245 p. ISBN 978-987-816-557-8.
