= PictureTel =

PictureTel Corporation
- Type: Public
- Industry: Telepresence & Videotelephony
- Founded: August 1984
- Founders: Brian L. Hinman; Jeffrey G. Bernstein; David H. Staelin
- Defunct: October 2001
- Headquarters: Danvers, Massachusetts, United States
- Products: (Partial list); C-2000 Codec; C-3000 Codec; V-2100 Videoconferencing System; V-3100; Live50; Live100; Live200; 600 Series; 900 Series; System 4000; Concorde 4500; Venue 2000; LiveShare Plus - Windows

PictureTel Corporation was one of the first commercial videoconferencing product companies. It achieved peak revenues of over $490 million in 1996 and 1997 and was eventually acquired by Polycom in October 2001.

== History ==
PictureTel was founded in August 1984 as PicTel by MIT students Brian L Hinman, Jeffrey G. Bernstein and MIT Professor David H. Staelin.

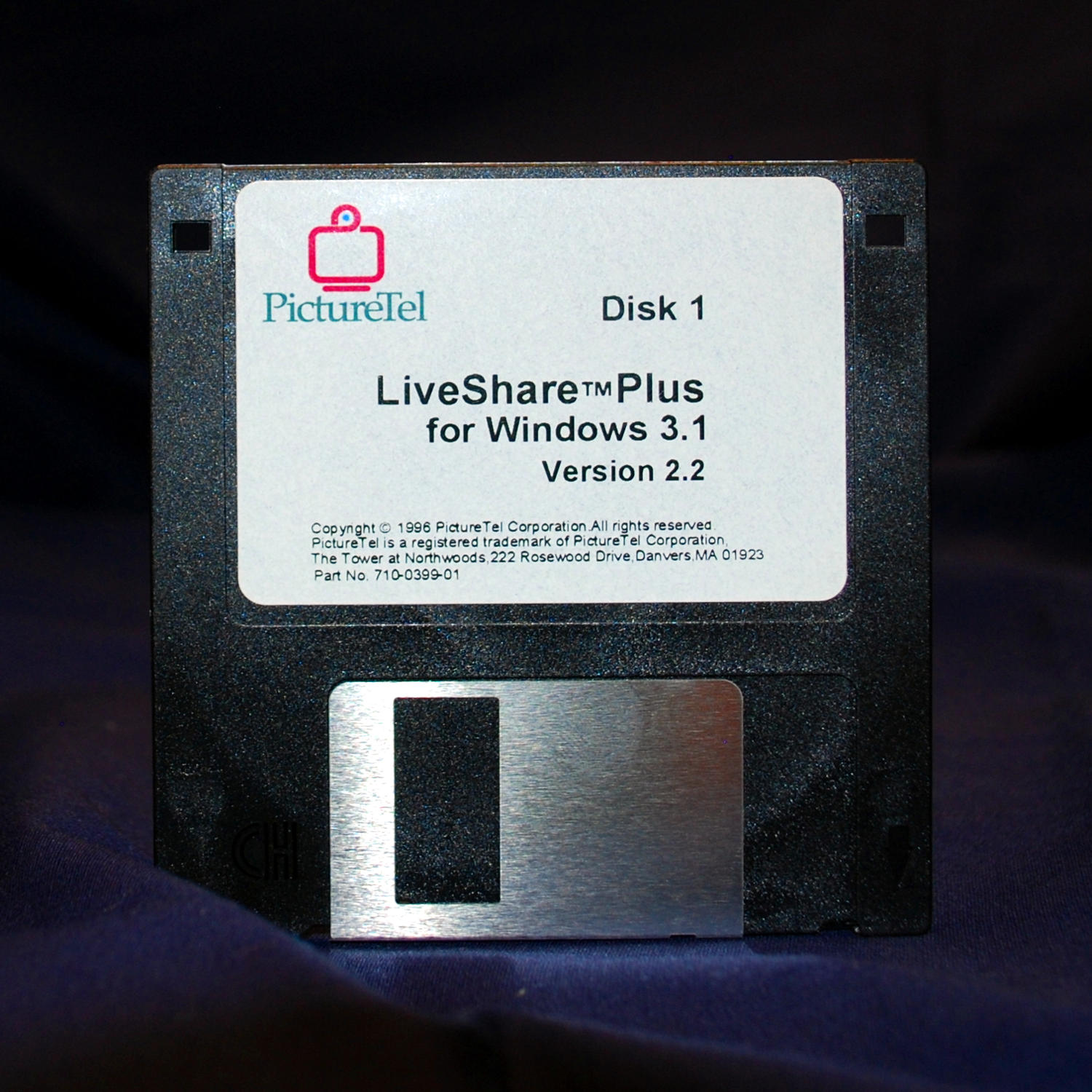
LiveShare Plus - MS Windows

The team was also assisted initially by MIT Professor Michael Dertouzos and two of his grad students Greg Papadopoulos and Richard Soley. The founding CEO was Ronald S. Posner Ph.D.

While at MIT Hinman and Bernstein were motivated by the video compression work by UC Davis Professor Anil K. Jain (1946–1988) and his colleague Jaswani R. Jain who published an important research paper combining block-based motion compensation and transform coding in December 1981. The result was PictureTel, creating one of the first real-time systems to implement motion compensation and transform coding in July 1986.

PictureTel was funded as "PicTel" by an initial public offering in November 1984, becoming a public company on virtually its first day of business. Product development started at this point. Its name was changed to PictureTel in 1987, due to concern about potential name conflict with another communications company, Pacific Telephone Co., also known as PacTel. While the company demonstrated its first product in 1986, the company did not have meaningful product sales until 1987.

PictureTel's first product, the C-2000 codec (compressor/decompressor) was the first commercial implementation of this computationally intensive technology. By analyzing the motion between successive frames rather than treating the frames as a sequence of unrelated images, this algorithm was significantly more data-efficient (required the transmission of much less data) than existing techniques. Requiring less data also meant that it was compatible with emerging dial-up data networks such as ISDN, making its use less expensive and more flexible than the leased, fixed-location lines normally used for high-speed data transmission at the time.

Subsequently, most of the video compression standards for two-way communications and video broadcast applications have been based upon motion compensation and transform coding, including those most widely used today such as H.264/MPEG-4 AVC. PictureTel played a strong role in developing the industry standards for video, audio, and data communications, and released much of its technology for use free of charge.

In October 2001, PictureTel was purchased by Polycom, a company that was co-founded in 1990 by Brian Hinman and another early PictureTel employee, Jeffrey Rodman. Hinman and Bernstein would later be instrumental in creating 2Wire.

== See also ==
- Ascend Communications
- Bonding protocol
- Compression Labs Inc.
- International Multimedia Telecommunications Consortium

== Bibliography ==
- Smith, Tom (May 14, 1990). PictureTel Codec Software to Improve Video, Audio. Vol. 7. IDG Network World Inc. p. 26.
- Margolis, Nell (December 17, 1990). PictureTel Prospers in Tough Times. Vol. 24. IDG Enterprise. p. 73.
- Brown, Bob (October 19, 1992). PictureTel Sets Sights on Desktop Market. Vol. 9. IDG Network World Inc. p. 29.
- Wexler, Joanie M. (May 17, 1993). PictureTel Makes Videoconferencing Cheaper. Vol. 27. IDG Enterprise. p. 58.
- Chen, Steven C.M. (June 14, 1994). PictureTel Corp. - PictureTel Live PCS 100. Vol. 13. Ziff Davis, Inc. p. 251.
- Messmer, Ellen (January 23, 1995). PictureTel to Unveil Group Share Data Collaboration Software. Vol. 12. IDG Network World Inc. p. 4.
- Cope, James (September 25, 2000). Caterpillar to Launch Satellite Videoconferencing System. Vol. 34. IDG Enterprise. p. 88.
