= Applied and Computational Harmonic Analysis =

- Discipline: Computational science, applied mathematics, harmonic analysis
- Language: English
- Edited by: Ronald Coifman, David Donoho

Publication details
- History: 1993–present
- Publisher: Elsevier
- Frequency: Bimonthly
- Impact factor: 3.2 (2024)

Standard abbreviations
- ISO 4: Appl. Comput. Harmon. Anal.

Indexing
- ISSN: 1063-5203
- LCCN: 94640949
- OCLC no.: 889363259

Links
- Journal homepage; Online archive

Applied and Computational Harmonic Analysis is a bimonthly peer-reviewed scientific journal published by Elsevier. The journal covers studies on the applied and computational aspects of harmonic analysis. Its editors-in-chief are Ronald Coifman (Yale University) and David Donoho (Stanford University).

== Abstracting and indexing ==
The journal is abstracted and indexed in:

- CompuMath Citation Index
- Current Contents/Engineering, Computing & Technology
- Current Contents/Physical, Chemical & Earth Sciences
- Inspec
- Scopus
- Science Citation Index Expanded
- Zentralblatt MATH

According to the Journal Citation Reports, the journal has a 2024 impact factor of 3.2.
