= Brian Hinman =

American businessman

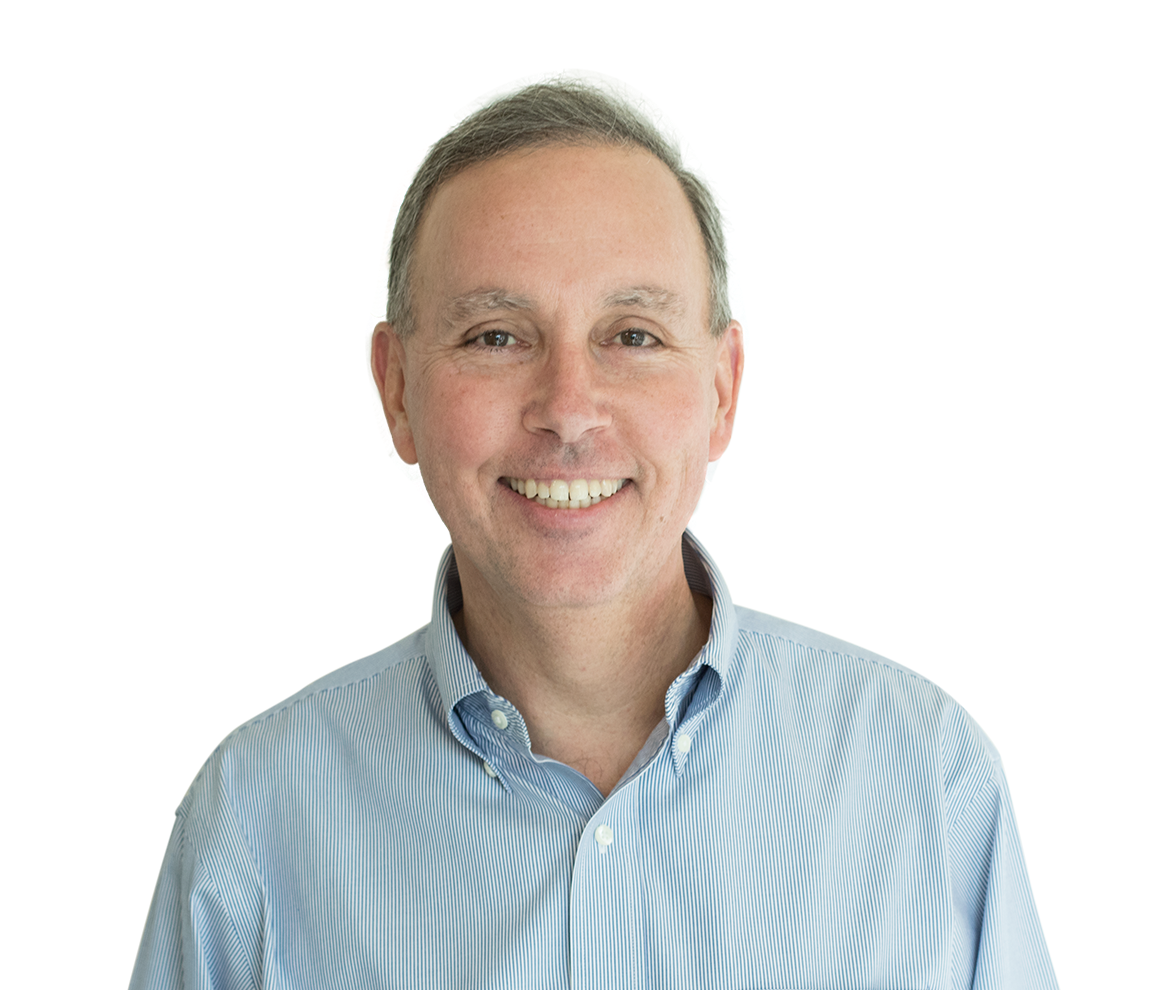
- Born: August 22, 1961 (age 65); Bethesda, Maryland
- Education: University of Maryland, College Park; MIT
- Occupations: Entrepreneur and investor

Brian L. Hinman (born August 22, 1961, in Bethesda, Maryland) is an entrepreneur and investor in high technology businesses, especially the computer-based communications industry.

== Entrepreneur career ==
Hinman has founded five successful technology companies, two of which had initial public offerings and three achieving annual revenues greater than $500 million PictureTel Corp. (Videoconferencing), Polycom (Conference call), and 2Wire (digital subscriber line).

PictureTel Corp. (Nasdaq 'PCTL') was founded in August 1984 in the Boston area and Hinman and his co-founders took PictureTel public three months later almost two years before the first product was shipped. Picturetel was the first major videoconferencing system and led that industry through the 1990s.

Polycom (Nasdaq 'PLCM') was founded in 1990 in Silicon Valley and soon was a popular voice conference room system in US corporations. Later they too successfully entered the videoconferencing market, becoming dominant enough to acquire Picturetel in late 2001.

2Wire was founded in 1998 and acquired by set-top box maker Pace in 2010 in July, 2010. Hinman has been granted patents in video compression and conference calls.

In 2012, Hinman co-founded Mimosa Networks, a gigabit wireless hardware company based in Santa Clara, CA. Hinman served as co-founder, CEO and president at Mimosa Networks. In November 2018, Mimosa merged with 5G mobile technologies leader Airspan Networks and later acquired by Reliance Jio in August, 2023. Mimosa equipment powers the AirFiber fixed wireless service in India. Reliance Jio operates the largest fixed wireless network in the world, with over 25 million subscribers.

In November 2021, Hinman founded SiFly Aviation, a US-based manufacturer of long-endurance cloud-native drones. The company came out of stealth mode in May, 2025, and soon after won the Uncrewed Triple Challenge and set a Guinness World Record for drone endurance.

== Investing career ==
From 2006 to 2015, Hinman worked at Oak Ventures as a venture partner where he worked with Cleantech investments, such as algae company Aurora Algae, and solar technology companies eSolar and GreenVolts. Hinman has also been involved with public-private partnerships by buying and funding an underfunded fire station in Los Gatos, California.

== Early life and education ==
Hinman, the son of Earl E Hinman, Jr and Roberta D. Hinman, grew up primarily in Wheaton, Maryland.

Brian received a BSEE from the University of Maryland, College Park in December 1982, and an MSEE from MIT in June 1984. Hinman later sponsored an entrepreneurship program at University of Maryland, College Park called the "Hinman CEOs".

== Awards ==
Hinman received the Ernst & Young Entrepreneur Of The Year Award in 2004 and was a national finalist in 2005. In 2011, the Rochester Institute of Technology awarded him an honorary doctorate of science. Previously Hinman received the Major F. Riddick Jr. Entrepreneurship Award by the University of Maryland and was recognized as one of the nation's most successful young entrepreneurs by the Association of Collegiate Entrepreneurs (ACE).
