= Collision avoidance (computer networking) =

Method to avoid network resource contention

In computer networking and telecommunication, collision-avoidance methods try to avoid resource contention by attempting to avoid simultaneous attempts to access the same resource.

Collision-avoidance methods include prior scheduling of timeslots, carrier-detection schemes, randomized access times, and exponential backoff after collision detection.

== See also ==
- Carrier sense multiple access with collision avoidance
- Polling
- Collision domain
