= 2Wire =

Home networking manufacturer

2Wire, Inc.
- Type: Public
- Industry: Consumer Electronics
- Founded: 1998; 28 years ago
- Defunct: 2010
- Fate: Acquired by Pace plc (2010)
- Successor: Arris Group
- Headquarters: San Jose, California, United States
- Key people: Pasquale Romano (president and CEO)
- Products: DSL modem, APN's; Broadband Gateways; DVRs
- Website: www.2wire.com

2Wire, Inc. was a computer hardware manufacturer active from 1998 to 2010 that provided telecommunications companies with home networking hardware, software, service platforms, and remote Customer Premises Equipment (CPE) management systems. The company was headquartered in San Jose, California, in the Silicon Valley. The company had employed approximately 1,600 employees globally, including 550 in R&D, sales and administration, 450 in customer care and 600 agency employees in five U.S. offices and an additional nine offices around the world by July 2010. The 2Wire HomePortal residential gateways were distributed by broadband service providers such as AT&T, Embarq, windstream and Qwest in the United States, Bell in Canada, Telmex in Mexico, BT Group in the United Kingdom, Telstra in Australia and SingTel in Singapore. In July 2010, Pace plc of the United Kingdom agreed to buy 2Wire for $475m (£307m).

== History ==
2Wire was founded in 1998 by Brian Hinman (who also founded PictureTel and Polycom), Pasquale Romano, Brad Kayton, Timothy Peers, and Tom Spalding. In January 2000, 2Wire delivered its first product, the HomePortal residential gateway, at that year's Consumer Electronics Show (CES). This broadband modem/router combination enabled DSL connectivity with home networking, firewall protection, and remote management capabilities. The following year, in January 2001, 2Wire delivered a wireless residential gateway.

In 2002, the company created a remote customer premises management platform called CMS. Later that year, 2Wire published the Open Gateway Management Protocol (OGMP). The OGMP formed the basis for the TR-069 WAN management protocol subsequently ratified by the DSL Forum in 2004.

In early 2003, 2Wire delivered a wireless gateway with a complete system-on-a-chip architecture. Also in 2003, the company acquired Sugar Media, a digital media provider.

The following year, in the spring of 2004, 2Wire launched MediaPortal, a multi-service media platform that integrates DSL and satellite services. The MediaPortal-powered set-top box, combining television, digital video recorder, video, music, photo viewings, and messaging capabilities, was deployed by AT&T in 2006 as part of its Homezone service.

In January 2006, 2Wire introduced the HomePortal intelligent Network Interface Device (iNID), an outdoor broadband residential gateway that supports VDSL2 and fiber to the premises (FTTP) connections.

2Wire acquired Kenati Technologies, an embedded device software company, in October 2007.

As of June 2008, 2Wire had shipped more than 20 million residential gateways to its telecommunications provider customers.

In November 2008, 2Wire and Blockbuster Inc. developed and released MediaPoint Digital Media Player, a set-top box that plays video content from a home computer network.

== Products ==
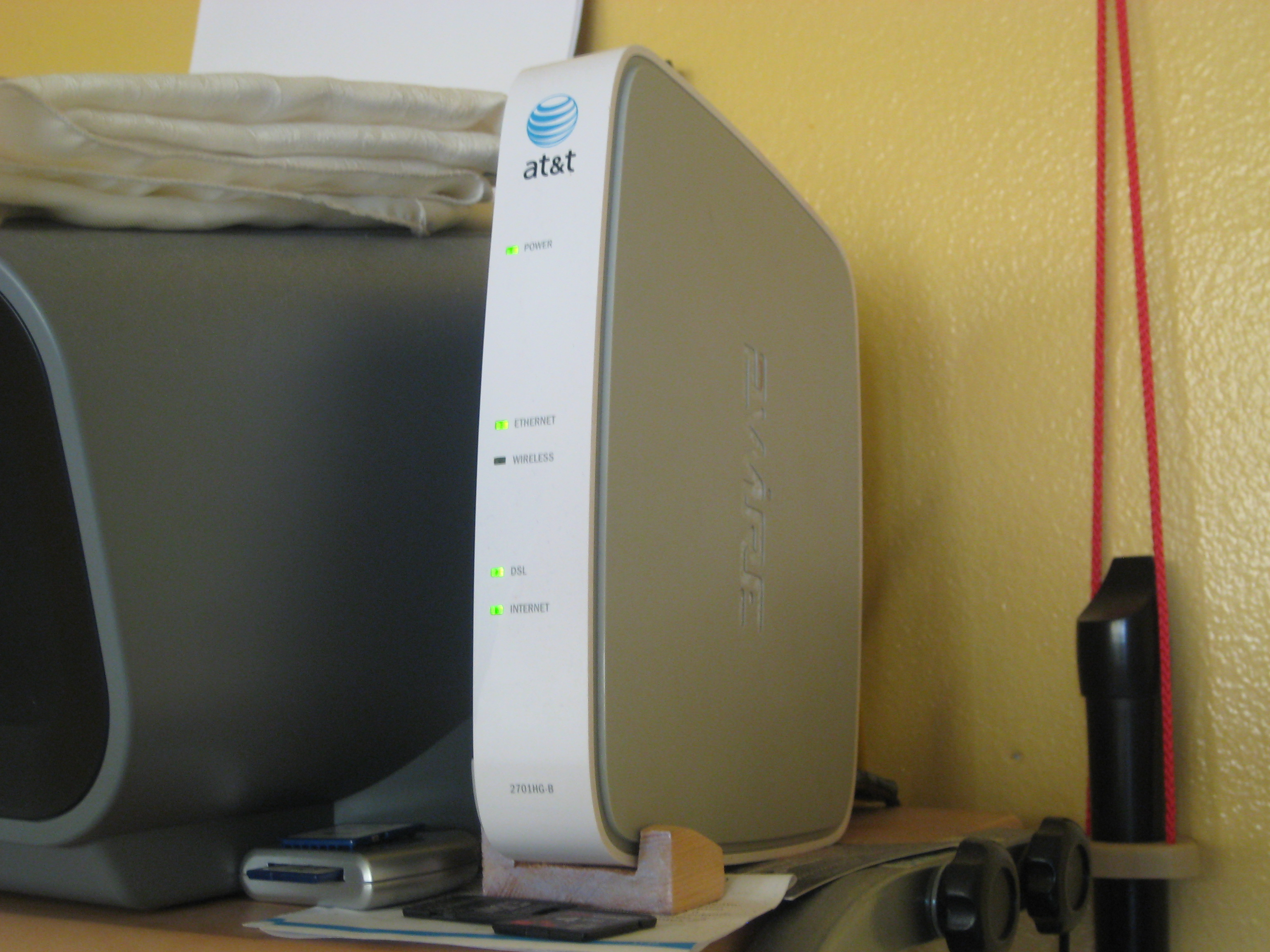
A 2701HG-B wireless gateway by 2Wire in California, USA issued by AT&T

2Wire produces a series of residential gateways under the HomePortal name that enable home networking with interfaces that range from ADSL 2+ to fiber to the node (FTTN) (VDSL 1 and 2), as well as FTTP. The gateways are based on integrated system-on-a-chip architectures, and have native TR-069 support, as well as support for HomePNA, MoCA, USB, 802.11b/g/n wireless standards, and Web-based remote access.

The company also produces MediaPortal (not to be confused with the unrelated open-source software MediaPortal), a multi-service media platform that combines high-definition (HD) and standard-definition (SD) broadcast satellite or off-air TV programming with broadband services, DVR capabilities, music and photo storage and sharing, and home networking.

One of its gateways, the 2701, had issues with the power supply, prompting Bell Canada to proactively swap the power supplies to its customers in 2008. Some laptops with two types of Intel wireless adaptors exhibited wireless issues, which were fixed by an updated Intel device driver.

The Pace 5012NV-002 Gateways were only available in Singapore for SingTel exStream Fiber Service and 2wire 2701 Series. In the rest of the world the brand is 2wire.

== Affiliations ==
- Alliance for Telecommunications Industry Solutions
- Broadband Forum (formerly DSL Forum)
- Digital Living Network Alliance
- Femto Forum
- HomePNA (formerly Home Phoneline Networking Association)
- Home Gateway Initiative
- Multimedia over Coax Alliance (MoCA)
- UPnP Forum (Universal Plug and Play Forum)
- Wi-Fi Alliance

== Partnerships ==
- Alcatel-Lucent
- AT&T
- Bell Canada
- BT Openworld
- CenturyLink
- Embarq
- Juno
- MTS Allstream
- NetZero
- Qwest
- SaskTel
- SingTel
- Telecom New Zealand
- Telenor
- TELMEX
- Telstra
- TELUS
- Verizon
- Windstream
