= Polycom =

Former American multinational corporation

Polycom, Inc.
- Logo prior to being acquired by Plantronics
- Type: Subsidiary
- Industry: Telecommunication
- Founded: December 1, 1990; 35 years ago
- Defunct: 2018
- Fate: Acquired by Plantronics
- Successor: Plantronics (dba Poly); HP Inc. (HP Poly)
- Headquarters: Santa Cruz, California, U.S.
- Key people: Mary McDowell (CEO)
- Products: Collaboration, video, voice, content, teleconference, telecommunications, telepresence and infrastructure software, hardware and services
- Revenue: ▼US$ 1.27 billion (2015)
- Net income: ▲US$ 69.98 million (2015)
- Number of employees: 3,451 (2018)
- Parent: HP Inc.

Polycom, Inc. was an American multinational corporation that developed video, voice and content collaboration and communication technology. The company was co-founded in 1990 by Brian L Hinman and Jeffrey Rodman.

In 2018 Polycom was acquired by Plantronics, and in 2019 the name of the combined entity was changed to Poly. In 2022 the combined company was sold to HP Inc., forming their HP Poly division.

== History ==
Polycom was co-founded in 1990 by Brian Hinman and Jeffrey Rodman, who were colleagues at PictureTel Corp. The startup was based in San Francisco, California but soon moved to San Jose, California, with Hinman using $400,000 of his own money and $100,000 from friends as seed money. Oak Investment Partners and Accel Partners then contributed an additional $3 million in venture capital. Polycom's stated goal was to support all the major ways people communicate, specifically including audio, content such as documents, and video. Its first products to market were audio conferencing speaker phones. The company later added content sharing, video conferencing, video network and bridging, and system monitoring and management products.

Brian Hinman served as CEO from the company's founding in 1990 until 1998, when he was succeeded by Bob Hagerty. Hagerty was succeeded by Andy Miller in 2010. At Polycom, Miller was charged with several expense and accounting violations by the SEC in 2012, and settled with the SEC by agreeing to not serve as an officer for any company for five years. Miller left Polycom after being paid US$24 million in compensation. He was succeeded as CEO by Peter Leav, who was then succeeded in 2016 by Mary McDowell following Polycom's acquisition by Siris Capital Group.

In 2015, Polycom cut 15% of its workforce after posting large dips in sales.

Polycom reported revenues of $1.3 billion for the year of 2015. Peter Leav at that point was both president and CEO, and Laura Durr was chief financial officer and executive vice president (EVP).

=== Acquisitions of Poly ===
In 2016, telecommunications executive Mary McDowell was named as its chief executive officer. On April 15, 2016, Polycom announced that rival Mitel Networks would purchase them for $1.96 billion. As Mitel, a smaller company based in Ottawa, Ontario, Canada, paid a lower tax rate, the acquisition would have been an example of tax inversion, where a smaller company purchases a larger company in order to provide the combined larger corporate entity with the tax benefits of the smaller company's location. In July 2016, the Mitel deal was scrapped in favor of an all-cash offer from New York City–based private equity firm Siris Capital Group. Siris acquired Polycom for $1.7 billion.

In 2017, Polycom had revenues of $1.1 billion. On March 28, 2018, Plantronics announced that it would acquire Polycom for approximately $2 billion. On December 27, 2018, Plantronics agreed to pay $36 million to settle a bribery investigation connected to Polycom. The United States Justice Department declined to bring criminal charges for misconduct that allegedly occurred between 2006 and 2014, citing Polycom's voluntary disclosure.

On March 28, 2022 HP Inc. announced their acquisition of Poly, completed in August 2022 with a total transaction value of $3.3 billion, including debt.

=== Acquisitions by Poly ===
Acquisition date	Company	Acquired company business	Reference
January 1998	ViaVideo Communications Inc.	Appliance-based video communications systems	
December 1999	Atlas Communications Engines, Inc	Integrated access device and DSL routers	
February 2001	Accord Networks	Provider of next-generation rich-media network products	
April 2001	Circa Communications	IP telephony products	
October 2001	PictureTel	PC-based video communications systems	
December 2001	ASPI Digital	Installed voice systems manufacturer	
June 2002	MeetU	Web collaboration software	
January 2003	VCAS software from AGT	Video scheduling and management software	
January 2004	Voyant Technologies	Voice conferencing and collaboration networking	
August 2005	DST Media	China-based video networking company	
January 2007	Destiny Conferencing	Immersive telepresence	
March 2007	Spectralink and KIRK telecom	Workplace wireless telephony	
March 2011	Accordent Technologies	Rich media streaming and management	
October 2011	ViVu Inc	Video collaboration software	
January 2018	Obihai Technology	VoIP audio	

Note : 1 June 2011 – HP and Polycom, announced they have entered into a definitive agreement under which Polycom will acquire the assets of HP's Visual Collaboration (HPVC) business, including the Halo Products and Managed Services business of HPVC.

== Products ==
The company also licensed a variety of technologies, including H.264 video codecs, Siren codecs, Session Initiation Protocol (SIP), native 1080p high-definition cameras and displays, native 720p and 1080p high-definition encoding/decoding, low-latency architecture and low bandwidth utilization, wideband advanced audio coding with low delay (AAC-LD), multichannel spatial audio with echo cancellation and interference filters to eliminate feedback from mobile devices, and inter-operation with legacy video conferencing.

=== SoundStation ===
Its first product in 1992 was SoundStation, a triangular speakerphone with full-duplex audio allowing both parties to simultaneously speak and be heard. SoundStation and its successor, SoundStation Premier became the leading brand in the market in the 1990s.

The SoundStation was superseded by the SoundStation 2 in 2004 when AT&T discontinued the AT&T DSP16A processor on which the original SoundStation was based. Building on technological advancements that occurred during the nearly 10-year period, the SoundStation 2 exhibited more features and improved sound transparency, although was still limited to 3 kHz audio bandwidth due to its conventional analog POTS connection.

It was supplemented by the SoundStation 2W wireless speakerphone, which was a DECT system (WDCT in North America), and by the SoundStation VTX1000 wired speakerphone, the first POTS speakerphone capable of 7 kHz audio or HD Voice operation over conventional telephone lines.

=== Audio products ===
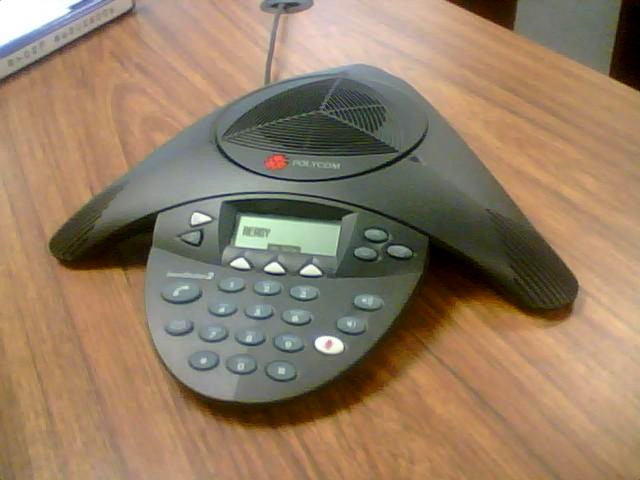
Polycom SoundStation IP 4000 SIP conference phone

When the first SoundStation conference phone shipped in 1992, the original device was followed by versions offering extended performance (SoundStation Premier, Premier Satellite, SoundStation EX). The SoundStation first shipped internationally (to the UK) in 1993, followed by other products and an expanding list of countries.

In December 2001, Polycom acquired ASPI networks, a company specializing in installed voice systems including the ASPI Vortex. With the 12-input and 12-output Vortex, Polycom's offerings could be extended to audio-visual integrators who needed to handle many more microphones and speakers than traditional teleconferencing systems provided. In 2007, Polycom introduced the Vortex successor, the Polycom SoundStructure series.

In the first quarter of 2001, Polycom introduced its first voice over IP conference phone, the SoundStation IP 4000. In 2008, the SoundStation IP 6000 and SoundStation IP 7000 models were introduced, both offering Polycom's HD Voice and Acoustic Clarity technology. In 2003, the firm introduced its first HD Voice product, the SoundStation VTX 1000 conference phone. In 2006, Polycom introduced its Communicator, the C100S, which was the industry's first HD Voice speakerphone for a PC.

In 1998, the firm entered the circuit-switched desktop phone business with a line of SoundPoint phones. In the third quarter of 2001, it entered the IP desktop phone business with the SoundPoint IP product line, starting with the SoundPoint IP500. Polycom VoIP phones use the open standard SIP to work with different call control platforms.

In 2007, Polycom acquired Spectralink Corp., whose product lines consisted of Wi-Fi and proprietary wireless telephone systems, as well as the KIRK DECT product line.

In 2008, Polycom added applications enablement to its SoundStation and SoundPoint IP phones. The first product to market was the company's Productivity Suite, for which the company offered an open API for third-party developers.

In 2009, the firm introduced two video-enabled voice products. One was the VVX 1500 business media phone, which combines a personal video conferencing system with a voice over IP (VoIP) telephone having HD Voice and an open API and Web browser. It also launched the CX5000, a table-mounted video and audio conferencing console with a 360-degree camera, by licensing the distribution rights for Microsoft Roundtable.

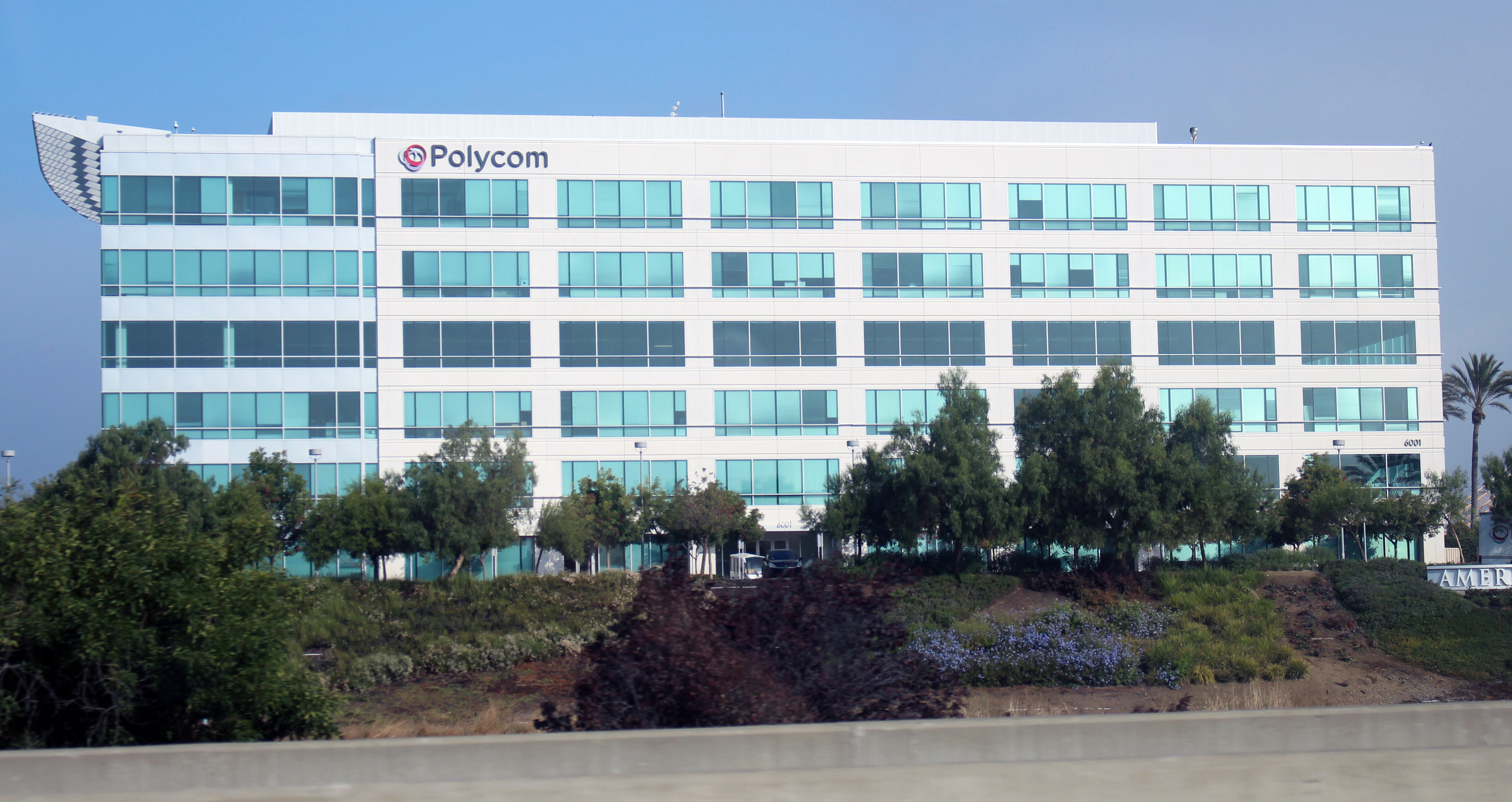
Former Polycom headquarters in San Jose

In 2011, Polycom announced the VVX 500, a VoIP business media phone with a gesture-based touchscreen interface.

In 2012 the Wi-Fi and DECT products were divested to a new company called Spectralink, spinning it off to Sun Capital Partners for about $110 million.

=== Video products ===
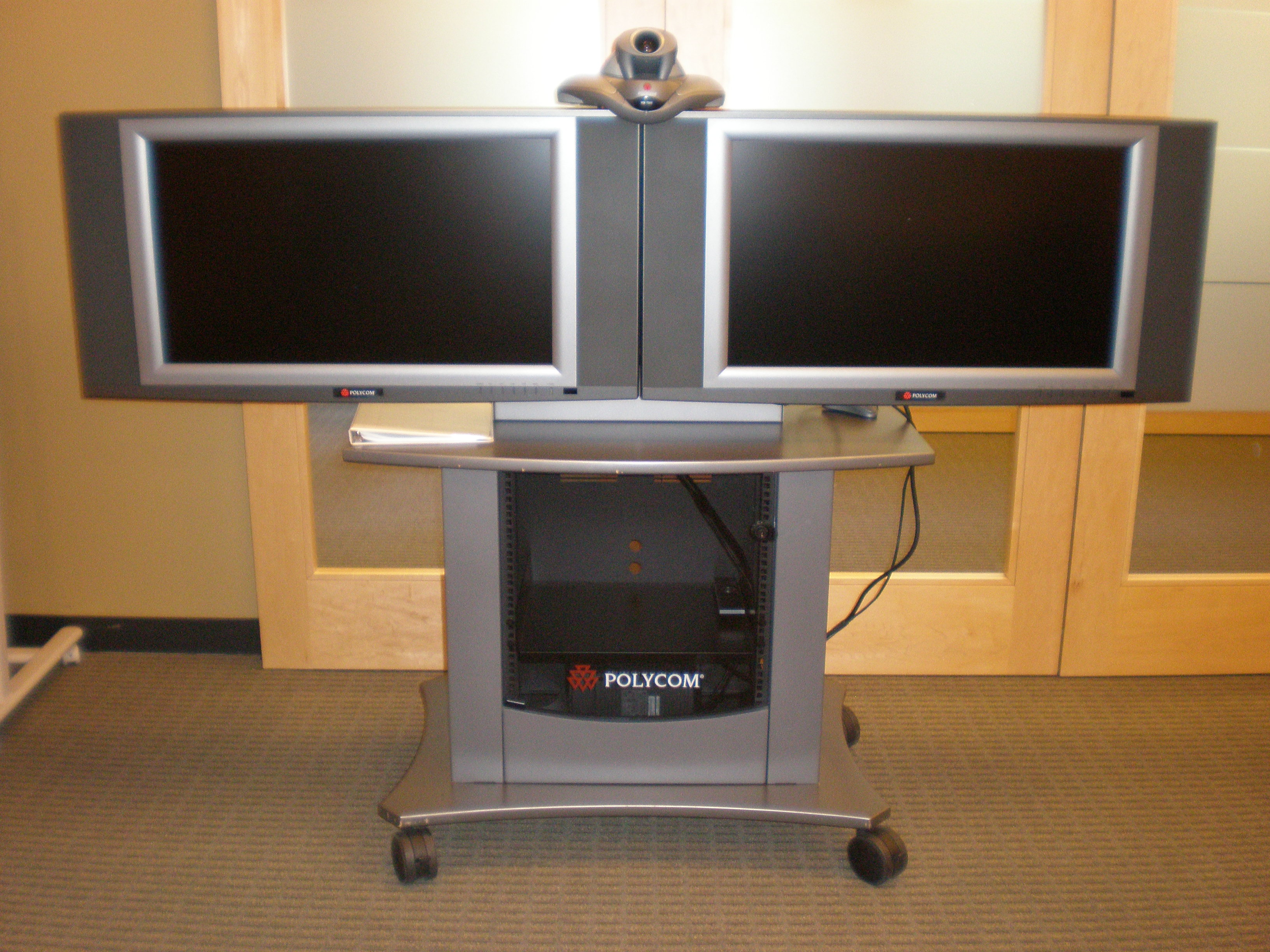
Polycom VSX 7000 unit with dual displays.

Polycom entered the video conferencing market in 1998 with the set-top unit ViewStation which integrated a PTZ (pan-tilt-zoom) camera with codec and communication electronics, and connected to a user-supplied video monitor on which it was designed to sit. ViewStation sold at the time for US$6000, and was relatively lightweight compared to competitors.

Polycom began the development of its first product in the new category of "Document Conferencing Projector", called ShowStation in 1994. In April 1996, Polycom went public on NASDAQ. In 1997, the company began shipping ShowStation in addition to its growing line of audio products and had total revenues of $47 million.

In January 1998, Polycom acquired ViaVideo for $54 million and its video conferencing product, which would be named ViewStation. The compact device provided the functionality of a webcam and included additional onboard processing capabilities to offset the computation limitations of most desktop and laptop computers at the time. As computer processing power increased, Polycom transitioned this hardware-software desktop solution to software-only clients called Polycom PVX, and later the Polycom RealPresence Desktop, or RPD.

Other members of the ViewStation product line included models with embedded multipoint capabilities, content sharing capabilities, and support for the emerging H.323 IP network protocol.

In February 2001, Polycom entered the multipoint bridging market through its acquisition of Accord Networks, which offered the MGC-100 line. In October 2001, it acquired PictureTel.

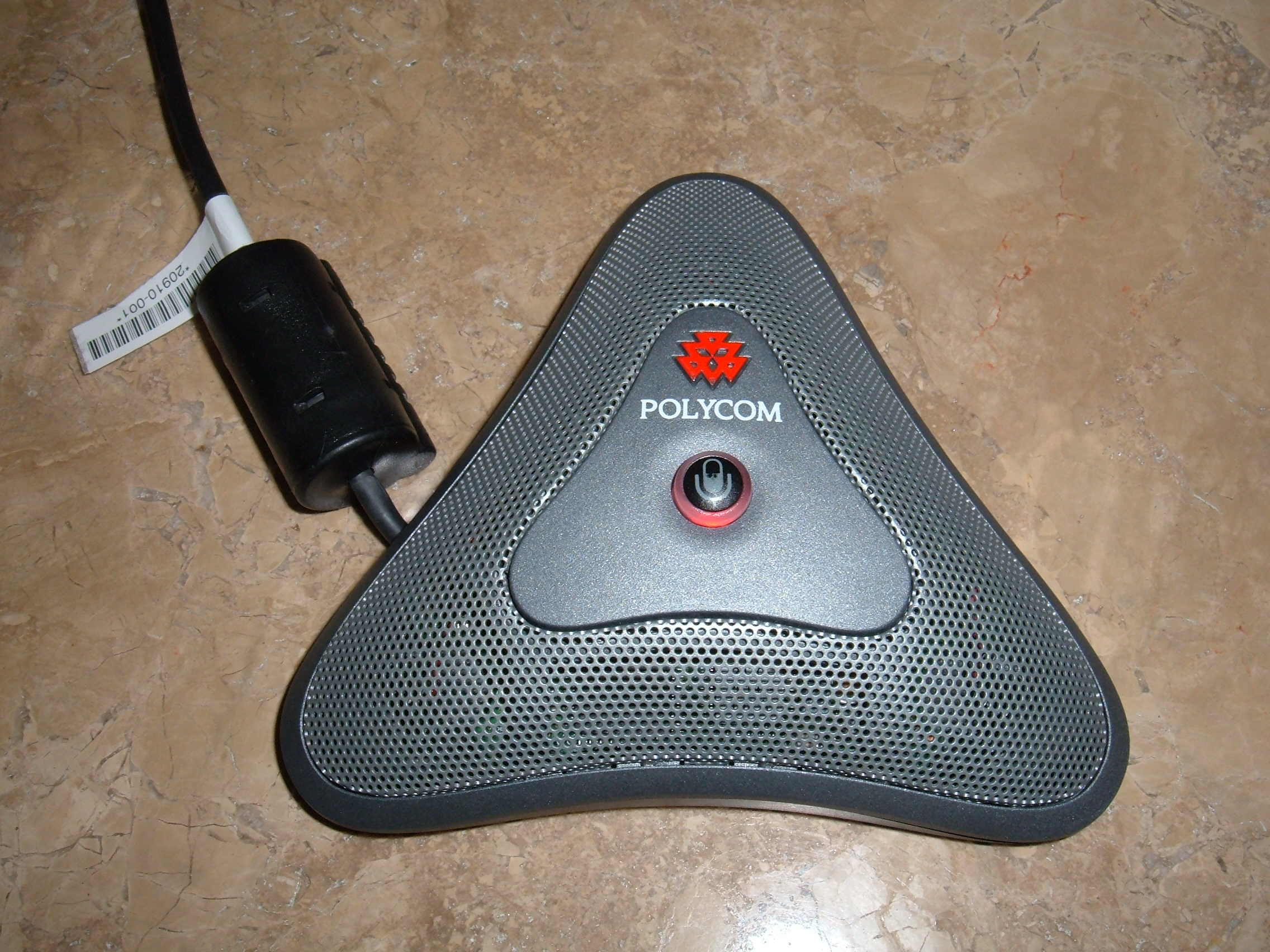
Polycom Digital Tabletop Microphone with mute button

In 2006, Polycom introduced its first HD (High Definition) video conferencing system. Soon after, it announced the Polycom RealPresence Experience (RPX), a three-screen, three-camera room-within-a-room "immersive" teleconferencing system based on a design by Destiny Conferencing (formerly TeleSuites) which Polycom acquired in January 2007.

In February 2007, the firm introduced a new multipoint bridge platform called RMX 2000, designed to support HD and telepresence applications. It also expanded its telepresence and HD video product lines in 2007 with the Polycom Telepresence Experience solutions and new executive desktop solutions, further expanding its line of room-based conference rooms.

In 2008, Polycom delivered the Polycom Converged Management Application (CMA) a video network and system management application for video networks. Later that year, the firm introduced the Distributed Media Application (DMA) 7000, a network-based application that manages and distributes multipoint video calls within a network. Toward the end of 2008, Polycom also announced its plans to increase performance of its systems from 30 to 60 frames per second at higher resolution – 1080p and 720p. In 2010, the firm introduced the Polycom Open Telepresence Experience (OTX 300), another three-screen immersive conference system with improved data-efficient codecs that used half the data bandwidth of other comparable systems at the time.

In 2011, Polycom posted $1.5 billion in revenue.
