= Foundry Networks =

American networking hardware vendor

- Type: Subsidiary
- Industry: Networking hardware
- Founded: 1996
- Defunct: December 19, 2008
- Fate: Acquired by Brocade Communications Systems
- Headquarters: Santa Clara, California, USA
- Key people: Bobby R. Johnson, Jr.
- Products: Switches, routers, application delivery controllers
- Revenue: ▲$607.205 million USD (2007)
- Operating income: ▲$82.866 million USD (2007)
- Net income: ▲$81.143 million USD (2007)
- Number of employees: 1100 (2008)
- Parent: Brocade Communications Systems
- Website: www.brocade.com

Foundry Networks, Inc. was a networking hardware vendor selling high-end Ethernet switches and routers. The company was acquired by Brocade Communications Systems on December 18, 2008.

== History ==
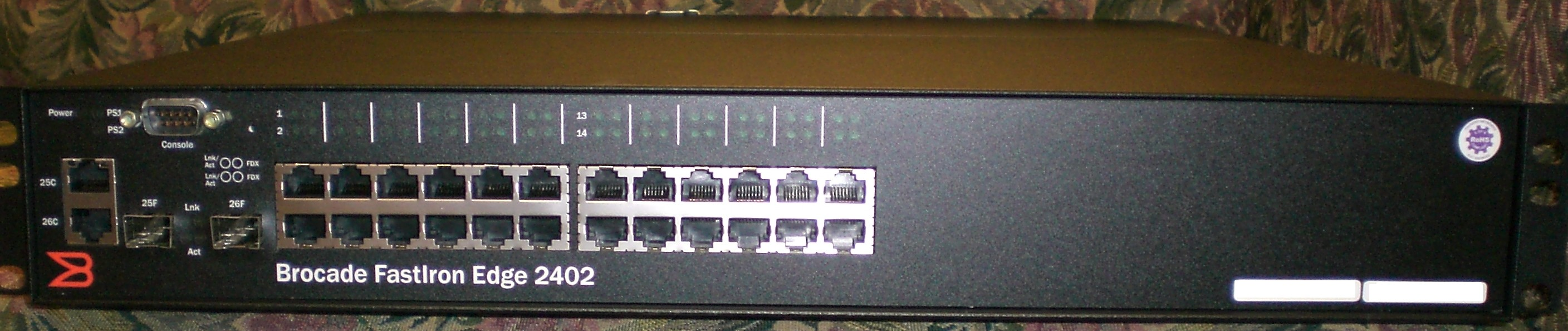
Brocade FastIron Edge 24-port switch, front

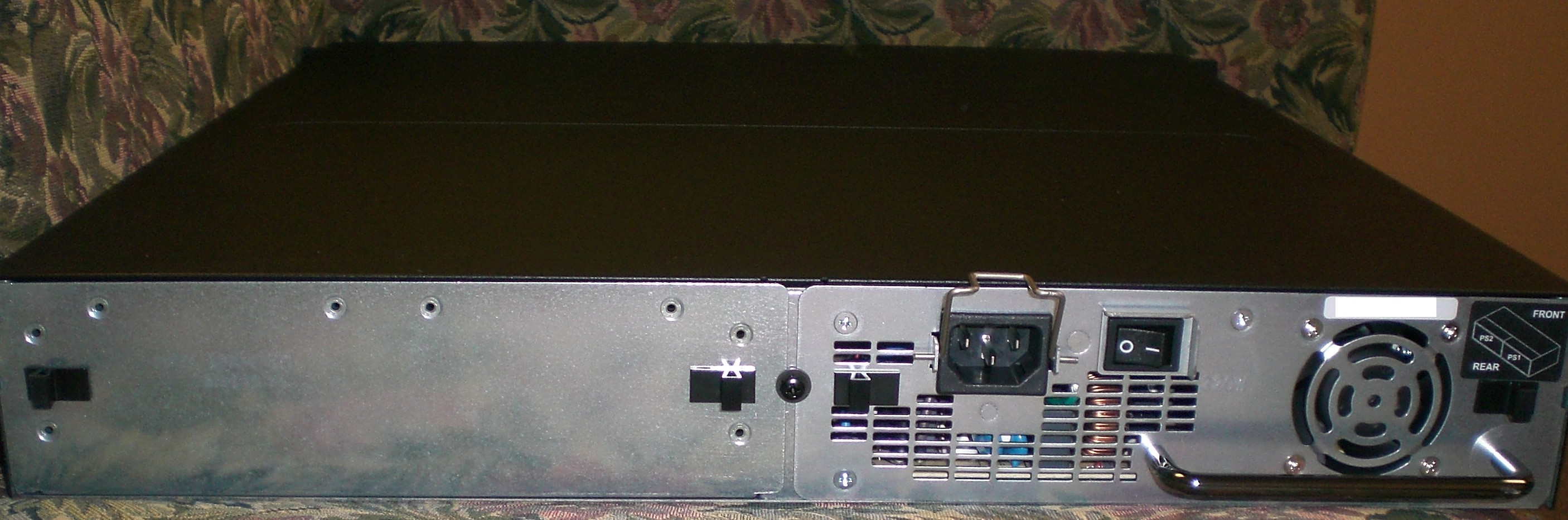
Brocade FastIron Edge 24-port switch, back

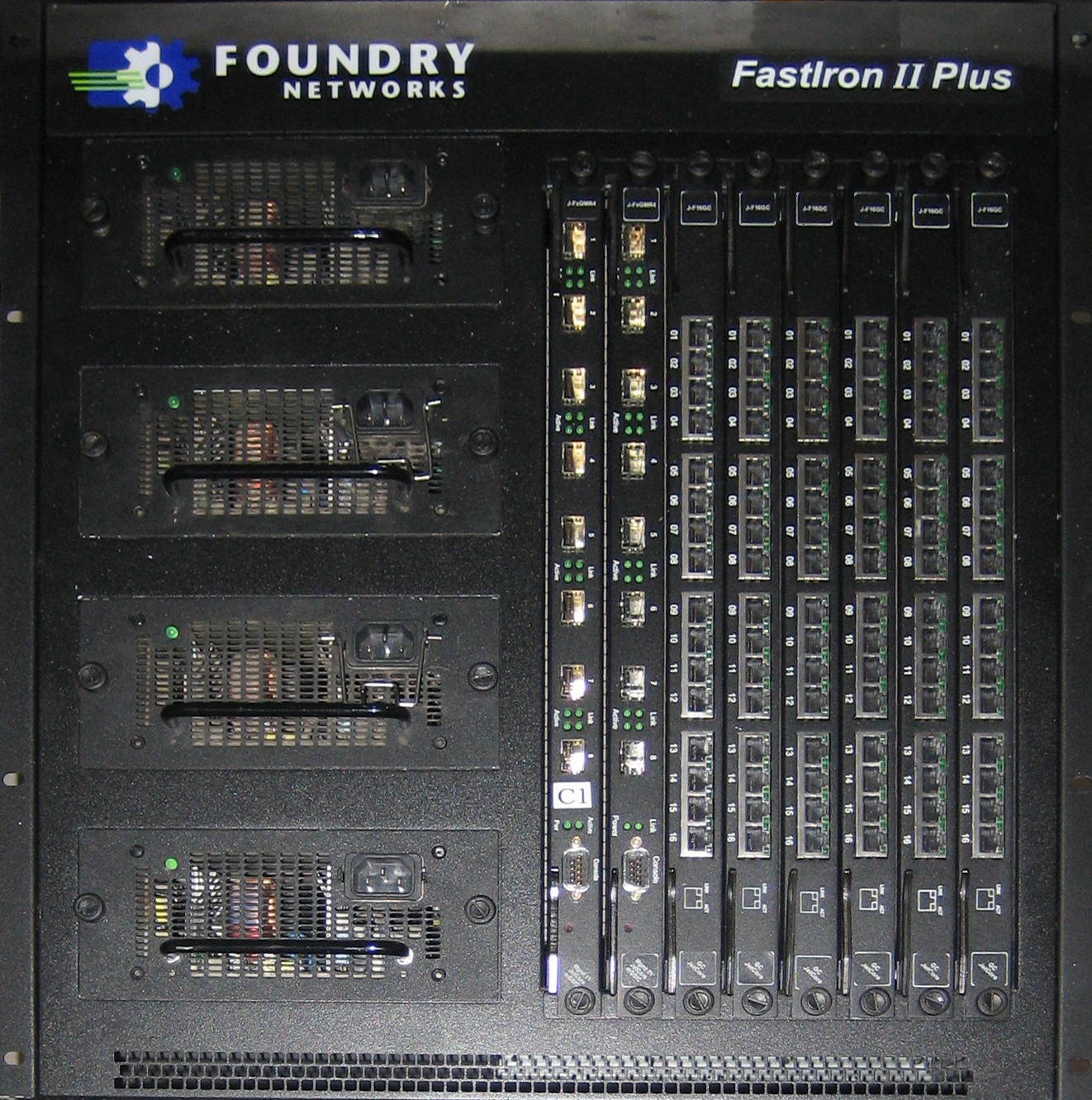
Foundry FastIron II Plus chassis with two fiber management cards and six 16-port gigabit Ethernet cards

The company was founded in 1996 by Bobby R. Johnson, Jr. and was headquartered in Santa Clara, California, United States. In its first year the company operated under the names Perennium Networks and StarRidge Networks, but by January 1997 the name Foundry Networks was adopted. Foundry Networks had its initial public offering in 1999, during the Internet bubble, with the company reaching a valuation of $9 billion on its first day of trading on NASDAQ with the symbol FDRY.

Foundry Networks designed, manufactured and sold high-end enterprise and service provider switches and routers, as well as wireless, security, and traffic management solutions. It was best known for its Layer 2 & 3 Ethernet switches. Foundry Networks was the first company to build and ship a gigabit Ethernet switch in 1997; to build a Layer 3 switch, also in 1997; to build the first Layer 4-7 switch in 1998 and to include 10 Gigabit Ethernet single connectors in its boxes (since 2001).

Foundry Networks early product lines consisted of the Workgroup, Backbone, and ServerIron products. The TurboIron all GigE switch and then router models were later introduced. Foundry Networks' later product lines consisted of the BigIron, EdgeIron, FastIron, IronPoint, NetIron, SecureIron, and ServerIron. After the early BigIron modular chassis, the Mucho Grande (MG) series chassis were introduced. Later the RX series in 4, 8, 16, and 32 slot versions. The largest and final product, the XMR was a full rack sized switch/router. Their software products included IronView and ServerIron TrafficWorks.

According to a Dell'Oro report published in 1Q2006, Foundry Networks ranked number 4 in a total market share of over US$3,659 million, and its ServerIron application switch ranked first for total port shipments.

== Acquisition ==
On July 21, 2008, Foundry management agreed to allow the company to be acquired by storage networking company Brocade Communications Systems for approximately $3 billion in cash and stock. On November 7, they agreed to a reduced purchase price of roughly $2.6 billion in an all-cash transaction when Brocade was unable to come up with a $400M tranche of financing required to complete the original deal. A meeting was scheduled for December 17, 2008, where shareholders approved the amended agreement.

The acquisition was completed on December 18, 2008.

Qatalyst Partners advised Brocade on financial matters, and Cooley Godward Kronish LLP was Brocade's legal adviser. TJ Grewal, Jody Kirk, and Alex Lam were the deal leads on the Brocade team.

Brocade sold Foundry's FastIron Campus portfolio to Arris (Ruckus Networks) and SRA portfolio to Extreme Networks in 2017.

== See also ==
- 3Com
- Brocade Communications Systems
- Cisco
- Extreme Networks
- HP ProCurve
- Ruckus Networks
- Nortel
