= A10 Networks =

U.S. computer network company

A10 Networks, Inc.
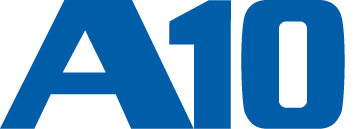
- Type: Public
- Traded as: NYSE: ATEN; Russell 2000 component; S&P 600 component
- Industry: Computer networking
- Founded: 2004; 22 years ago
- Founder: Lee Chen
- Headquarters: San Jose, California, U.S.
- Key people: Dhrupad Trivedi (CEO)
- Revenue: ▲US$291 million (2025)
- Net income: ▼US$42.1 million (2025)
- Number of employees: 590 (2021)
- Website: a10networks.com

A10 Networks, Inc. is an American public company specializing in the manufacturing of application delivery controllers (software and hardware). Founded in 2004 by Lee Chen, co-founder of Foundry Networks, A10 originally serviced just the identity management market with its line of ID Series products. In early 2007, they added bandwidth management appliances (EX Series). The company had its initial public offering on March 21, 2014, raising $187.5 million.

== History ==
In mid-2007, A10 Networks launched its AX Series of application delivery controllers/load balancing appliances.

On May 21, 2013, A10 resolved its question of responsibility for intellectual property infringement and unfair competition practices by reaching a settlement with Brocade Communications Systems. Brocade had earlier been awarded $112 million in 2012.

In May 2013, A10 launched its A10 Thunder Series platforms of hardware and software application delivery controllers (ADCs).

A10 Networks released the Harmony design of the Thunder Series ADC in 2015.

Also in 2015, A10 Networks upgraded the Advanced Core Operating System (ACOS). The update allowed 100 percent of software capabilities to be addressed by APIs, whereas the previous ACOS could only address 40 percent through APIs.

In 2016, A10 acquired the cloud-native ADC company Appcito.

In 2021, according to the companies annual report, A10 Networks closed its India and China offices and reduce its headcount.
