= Alteon WebSystems =

Computer network hardware company

Alteon WebSystems Incorporated
- Industry: Computer networking
- Founded: 1996; 30 years ago
- Fate: Acquired by Nortel in 2000; Acquired by Radware in 2009
- Headquarters: San Jose, California, United States
- Products: Network switches Network interface controllers
- Parent: Radware
- Website: www.radware.com/products/alteon

Logo of Alteon Networks, Inc.

Logo of AlteonWebSystems

Alteon WebSystems (originally Alteon Networks, Inc.) is a division of Radware that produces application delivery controllers.

Alteon was acquired by Nortel Networks on October 4, 2000. On February 22, 2009 Nortel Networks sold the Alteon application switching line to Radware.

== History ==
Alteon Networks was founded in 1996 by Mark Bryers, John Hayes, Ted Schroeder and Wayne Hathaway. Initial venture capital investors were Matrix Partners and Sutter Hill Ventures. Dominic Orr became chief executive in October 1996.

Alteon introduced innovative products such as the ACEswitch 180, which was the first network switch to deliver Ethernet with selectable speed, 10/100 or 1000 Mbit/s, on every port via autonegotiation. Their ACEdirector Layer 4-7 switch was designed as an integrated services front-end and server load balancer. It also introduced Jumbo Frames (up to 9,000 bytes) with its ACEnic adapters, and supported by its switches.

In addition to server switches, Alteon produced the first network interface controller (NIC) in 1997 that used Gigabit Ethernet (demonstrated at the Networld + Interop trade show in September 1996). Alteon's third generation Gigabit Ethernet NIC (code named "Tigon") became the basis for Broadcom's family of Ethernet controllers (series BCM570x) and has shipped over 60 million copies. It was used in low-cost adapters from vendors such as 3Com.

In July 2000, Nortel Networks announced it was buying Alteon for US$6 billion in stock. The deal had originally been announced with a value of $7.8 billion, but the stock market plummeted before the deal closed in October. Nortel rolled the ACEDirector and ACESwitch products into its Personal Internet product line, but one year later sales had slowed down. On February 22, 2009 Nortel Networks announced it would sell the Alteon application switching line to Radware, for $17.65 million.

In November 2013, Radware announced the Alteon NG, marketed as an application delivery controller.
