= Cotendo =

Content delivery network

Cotendo, Inc.
- Type: Private company
- Founded: 2008
- Headquarters: Sunnyvale, California, United States
- Products: Content Delivery
- Website: http://www.cotendo.com

Cotendo, Inc. was an American content delivery network and an application delivery network service provider. The company's headquarters was in Sunnyvale, California, with research and development based in Netanya, Israel. In March 2012, Akamai acquired Cotendo for over US$300 million.

== Timeline ==
Cotendo was founded by Ronni Zehavi Udi Trugman, David Drai, in January 2008 with funding from Sequoia Capital.

On March 10, 2009, Cotendo launched their CDN service and announced a US$7 million second round of funding from Sequoia Capital and Benchmark Capital.

On March 6, 2012, Akamai acquired Cotendo for over US$300 million.

== See also ==
- Peer-to-peer
- Content delivery network
- Application delivery network
