= Radware =

Israeli cybersecurity company

Radware Ltd.
- Type: Public
- Traded as: Nasdaq: RDWR
- Industry: Technology
- Founded: 1997; 29 years ago
- Headquarters: Mahwah, New Jersey (corporate)
- Key people: Roy Zisapel (CEO); Doron Abramovitch (CFO); Gabi Malka (COO)
- Products: Application delivery Network Security; Load balancing
- Revenue: ▲US$ 216.57 million (2015)
- Net income: ▲US$ 18.57 million (2015)
- Number of employees: 1000+
- Website: radware.com

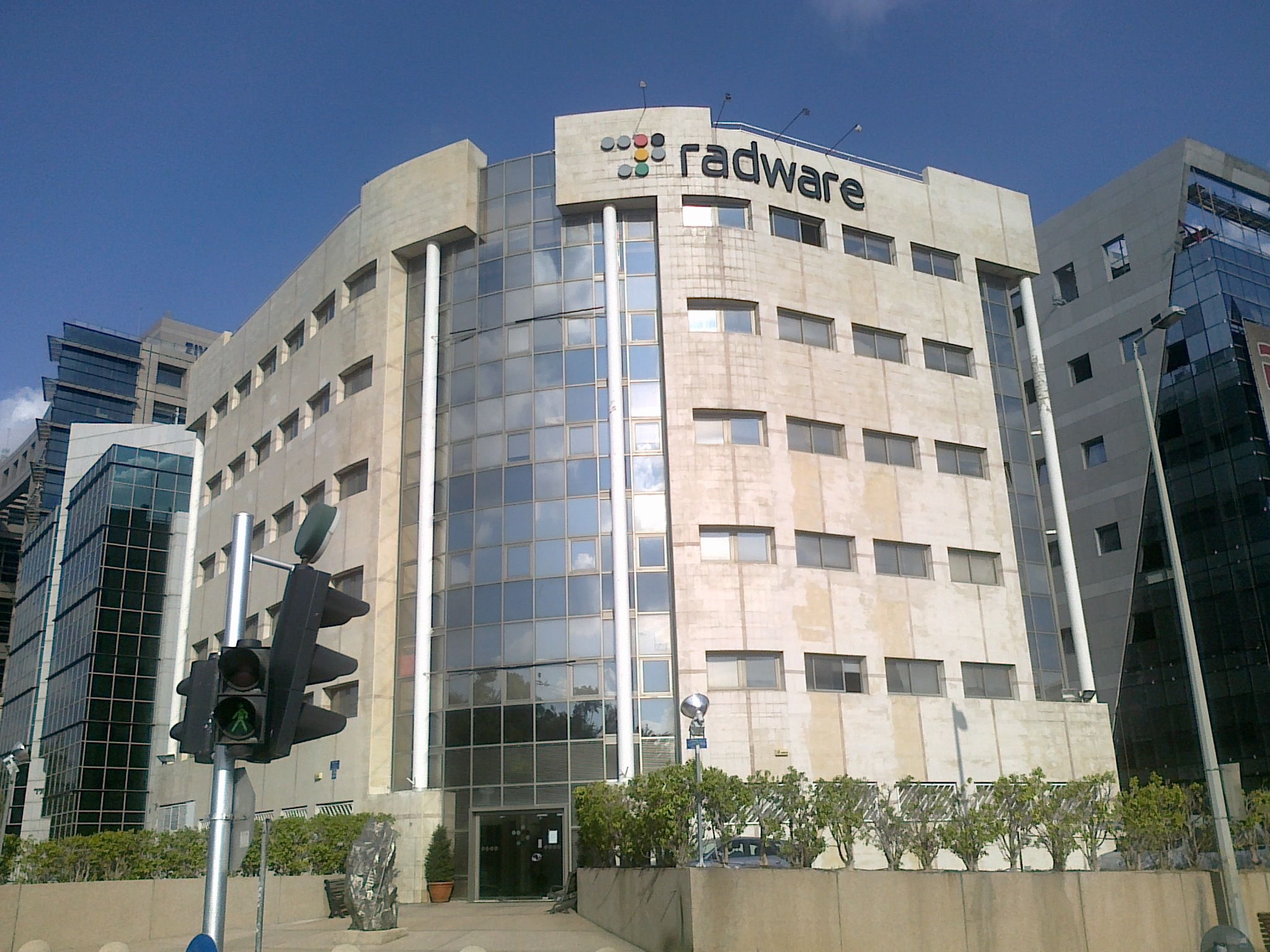
Radware's international headquarters in Ramat HaHayal, Tel Aviv

Radware Ltd. is an American provider of cybersecurity and application delivery products for physical, cloud and software-defined data centers. Radware's corporate headquarters are located in Mahwah, New Jersey. The company also has offices in Europe, Africa and Asia Pacific regions. The company's global headquarters is in Israel. Radware is a member of the Rad Group of companies and its shares are traded on NASDAQ.

== History ==
Radware co-founder Roy Zisapel has served as president, chief executive officer and Director since the company's inception in April 1997. In 1999, the company had an initial public offering and was listed on the NASDAQ stock exchange. Zisapel holds a 3.4 percent stake in the company. His father, Yehuda Zisapel, is the largest shareholder, with a 15 percent stake.

== Acquisitions ==
In January 2019, Radware expanded its cloud security portfolio with the acquisition of ShieldSquare, a market-leading bot management provider. In January 2017, Radware acquired Seculert, a SaaS cloud-based provider of protection against enterprise network breach and data exfiltration. In February 2013, Radware acquired Strangeloop Networks, a leader in web performance optimization (WPO) services for e-commerce and enterprise applications. In April 2007, Radware acquired Covelight Systems, a provider of web application auditing and monitoring tools. In February 2009, Radware acquired Nortel's application delivery business. In November 2005, Radware acquired V-Secure Technologies, a leading provider of behavioral-based network intrusion prevention products.

== Products ==
Radware's products and services include cloud services (Cloud WAF, Cloud DDoS Protection, Cloud Workload Protection, Cloud Web Acceleration, Cloud Malware Protection, and Bot Manager), application and network security (DefensePro, AppWall, DefenseFlow), application delivery and load balancing (Alteon, AppWall, FastView, AppXML, LinkProof NG), and management and monitoring (Cyber Controller, APSolute Vision, MSSP Portal, Application Performance Monitoring, vDirect).

== Sales markets ==
The company sells its products worldwide through distributors and resellers located in the Americas, Europe, Middle East, Africa and Asia Pacific. Its customers include financial services, insurance, e-Commerce, manufacturing, retail, government, healthcare, education, and transportation services and carriers. Radware's more than 12,500 customers include Switch, Hexatom, QuadraNet, ProtonMail, Convergys, SingleHop, OnlineTech, Limelight Networks, BlackMesh and Brinkster.

== Industry recognition ==
Most recently, Radware was awarded WAF and Anti DDoS Vendor of the Year at Frost & Sullivan's 2018 India ICT Awards, and was positioned as a leader in IDC MarketScape for Global DDoS Prevention. In 2018, Radware received several awards, including WAF Vendor of the Year Award (Frost & Sullivan), Cloud Computing Product of the Year (TMC and Cloud Computing Magazine), and the Fortress Cyber Security Award (Business Intelligence Group).

== See also ==
- Application delivery
- Network security
- Science and technology in Israel
