= TCP delayed acknowledgment =

Transmission Control Protocol technique

TCP delayed acknowledgment is a technique used by some implementations of the Transmission Control Protocol in an effort to improve network performance. In essence, several ACK responses may be combined into a single response, reducing protocol overhead. However, in some circumstances, the technique can reduce application performance.

== Method and advantages ==
As described in RFC 1122, a host may delay sending an ACK response by up to 500 ms. Additionally, with a stream of full-sized incoming segments, ACK responses should be sent for every second segment. RFC 1122 references RFC 813 of 1982 as the original description of delayed ACK.

Delayed ACKs can give the application the opportunity to update the TCP receive window and also possibly to send an immediate response along with the ACK. For certain protocols such as Telnet, delayed ACKs can reduce the number of responses sent by the server by a factor of 3, by combining the ACK, window update and the response data into one segment.

== Problems ==
The additional wait time introduced by the delayed ACK can cause further delays when interacting with certain applications and configurations. If Nagle's algorithm is being used by the sending party, data will be queued by the sender until an ACK is received. If the sender does not send enough data to fill the maximum segment size (for example, if it performs two small writes followed by a blocking read) then the transfer will pause up to the ACK delay timeout. Linux 2.4.4+ supports a TCP_QUICKACK socket option that disables delayed ACK.

For example, consider a situation where Bob is sending data to Carol. Bob's socket layer has less than a complete packet's worth of data remaining to send. Per Nagle's algorithm, it will not be sent until he receives an ACK for the data that has already been sent. At the same time, Carol's application layer will not send a response until it gets all of the data. If Carol is using delayed ACKs, her socket layer will not send an ACK until the timeout is reached.

If the application is transmitting data in smaller chunks and expecting periodic acknowledgment replies, this negative interaction can occur. To prevent this delay, the application layer needs to continuously send data without waiting for acknowledgment replies. Alternatively, Nagle's algorithm may be disabled by the application on the sending side.
