= Belden Incorporated =

American technology company

Belden Inc.
- Type: Public
- Traded as: NYSE: BDC; S&P 400 component
- Industry: Electronics
- Founded: 1902; 124 years ago in Chicago, Illinois, US
- Founder: Joseph C. Belden
- Headquarters: St. Louis, Missouri, US
- Key people: Ashish Chand (President and CEO)
- Products: Networking, connectivity, cable, and security products
- Revenue: ▲US$2.461 billion (2024)
- Operating income: ▼US$266.5 million (2024)
- Net income: ▼US$198.4 million (2024)
- Total assets: US$3.328 billion (2024)
- Total equity: US$1.295 billion (2024)
- Number of employees: ~7,500 (2024)
- Website: www.belden.com

Belden Inc. is an American multinational company that designs, manufactures, and distributes networking, connectivity, cable, and security products. Headquartered in St. Louis, Missouri, the company is publicly traded on the New York Stock Exchange under the ticker symbol BDC and is a component of the S&P 400. Belden serves industrial automation, enterprise, smart-building, and broadband markets.

== History ==
=== Founding and early years ===
Belden was founded in Chicago, Illinois, in 1902 by Joseph C. Belden as the Belden Manufacturing Company. A former purchasing agent for the Kellogg Switchboard & Supply Company, Belden started the company to produce the high-quality silk-wrapped magnet wire used in telephone switchboard coils. In 1910 the company introduced an enamel wire insulation marketed as "Beldenamel," which became an industry standard. Over the following decades Belden expanded into electrical wiring, cable, and signal-transmission products used in radio broadcasting, television, industrial automation, and computer networking.

=== Cooper Industries and 1993 spin-off ===
In 1980 Belden was acquired by the Crouse-Hinds Company, which was itself acquired by Cooper Industries in 1981, making Belden a division of Cooper Industries. In 1993 Belden was spun off as an independent, publicly traded company listed on the New York Stock Exchange, with corporate headquarters in St. Louis, Missouri.

=== Merger with Cable Design Technologies ===
In 2004 Belden merged with the Cable Design Technologies Corporation (CDT) to form Belden CDT Inc., which later resumed the name Belden Inc. In 2005, John Stroup was appointed president and chief executive officer. Under Stroup, Belden pursued a series of acquisitions in industrial networking, broadband, cybersecurity, and connectivity, expanding beyond its traditional wire-and-cable business.

Acquisitions during this period included Hirschmann and Lumberg Automation (2007), Telecast Fiber Systems (2009), GarrettCom (2010), Byres Security and Poliron (2011), Miranda Technologies and PPC (2012), and OTN Systems (2021).

=== Recent developments ===
In February 2023, Belden appointed Ashish Chand as president and chief executive officer. In April 2023, as part of a community program, Belden donated $100,000 to the Richmond Fire Department in Richmond, Indiana, to fund firefighting equipment upgrades.

For the 2024 fiscal year, Belden reported revenues of approximately $2.46 billion and net income of $198.4 million. The company reported record revenues of about $2.72 billion for the 2025 fiscal year.

On July 1, 2026, Belden completed its acquisition of RUCKUS Networks from Vistance Networks in a cash transaction valued at approximately $1.87 billion, net of cash acquired. The deal, funded in part by a $1.85 billion senior secured term loan, added enterprise Wi-Fi, Ethernet switching, and AI-driven network-management platforms to Belden's portfolio, which the company said strengthened its position as a provider of end-to-end information technology (IT) and operational technology (OT) networking solutions.
