= Ruckus Networks =

Networking equipment brand

Ruckus Networks, Inc.
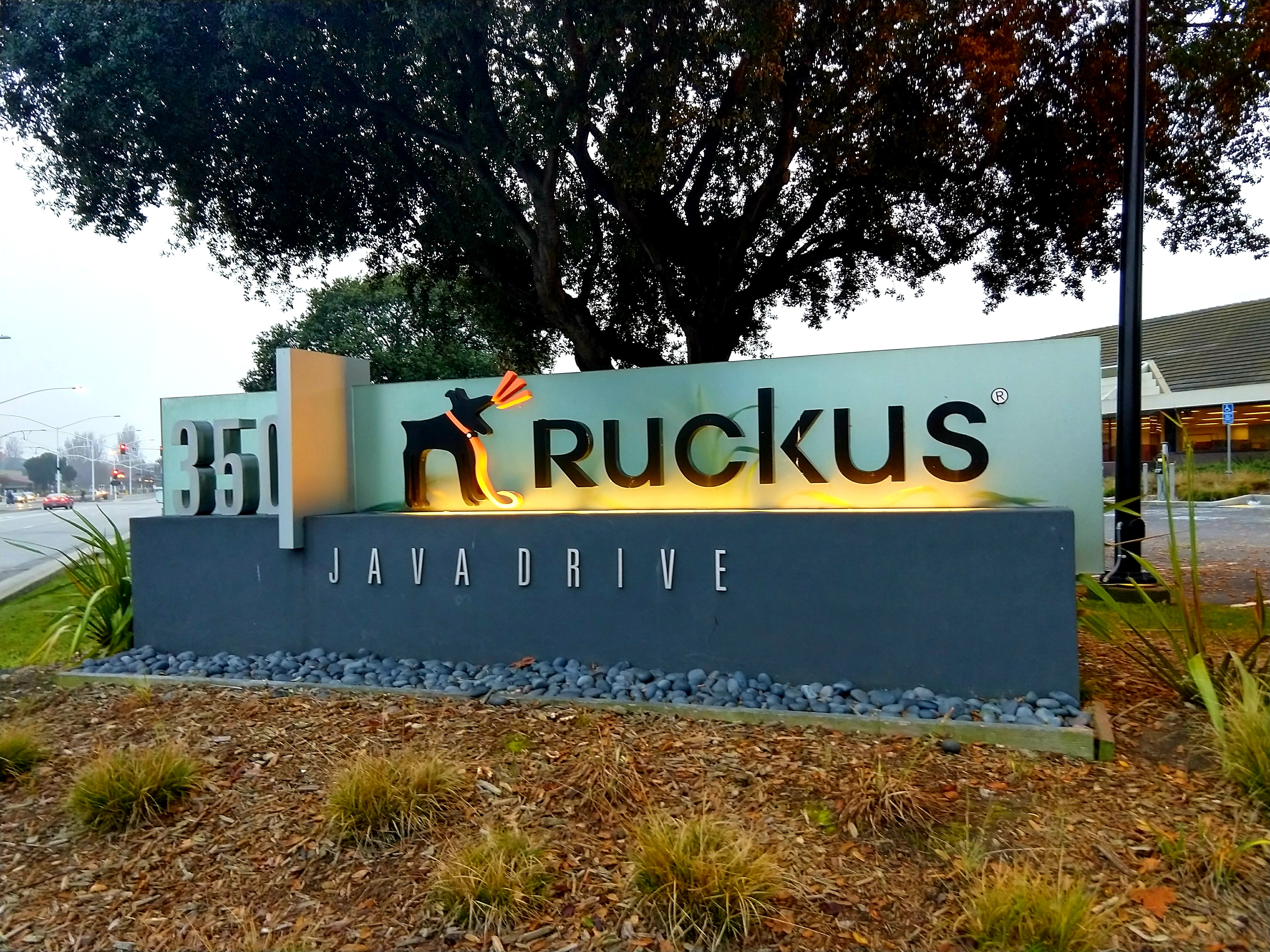
- Formerly: Ruckus Wireless, Video54 Technologies, SCEOS
- Type: Subsidiary
- Traded as: NYSE: RKUS (2012–2016)
- Industry: Telecommunications equipment; Networking hardware; Networking software
- Founded: June 17, 2004; 22 years ago in Menlo Park, California, U.S.
- Founders: William Kish; Victor Shtrom
- Headquarters: Sunnyvale, California, U.S.
- Area served: Worldwide
- Products: Hardware, software, and services to telecommunications service providers and enterprises
- Parent: Belden (2026–present); Vistance Networks (2026); CommScope (2019–2026); Arris International (2017–19); Brocade (2016–17)
- Website: www.ruckusnetworks.com

Ruckus Networks (formerly known as Ruckus Wireless) is a brand of wired and wireless networking equipment and software owned by Beldon. It offers switches, Wi-Fi access points, CBRS access points, controllers, management systems, cloud management, AAA/BYOD software, AI and ML analytics software, location software and IoT controller software products to mobile carriers, broadband service providers, and corporate enterprises. Ruckus invented and has patented wireless voice, video, and data technology, such as adaptive antenna arrays that extend signal range, increase data rates, and avoid interference, providing distribution of delay-sensitive content over standard 802.11 Wi-Fi.

Ruckus began trading on the New York Stock Exchange in 2012. It was delisted in 2016, after it was acquired by Brocade Communications Systems for approximately $1.5 billion on May 27, 2016. Ruckus Wireless and the Brocade ICX line of switching products were acquired by Arris International for $800 million in a deal finalized on December 1, 2017. The company was renamed Ruckus Networks, an ARRIS company from Ruckus Wireless. On April 4, 2019, CommScope completed its acquisition of Arris, which included the recently acquired Ruckus.

On January 12, 2026, CommScope completed the sale of its Connectivity and Cable Solutions segment to Amphenol. As the CommScope name and brand transferred with that business, the remaining company was renamed Vistance Networks, which became the parent company of Ruckus Networks and Aurora Networks. On April 30, 2026, Belden announced an agreement to acquire Ruckus Networks from Vistance Networks for approximately $1.85 billion. The transaction is expected to close in the second half of 2026, subject to customary closing conditions and regulatory approvals. On July 1, 2026, Ruckus announced that the acquisition had been completed.

== History ==
=== Origin, incubation and funding ===
Ruckus Networks started in 2002 as an incubator project named SCEOS (Sequoia Capital EntertainmentOperating System) funded by a small seed round from Sequoia Capital, in Menlo Park, California. After incubation, Ruckus was incorporated in June 2004 as Video54 Technologies Inc., by William Kish and Victor Shtrom. Sequoia Capital, WK Technology Fund, and Sutter Hill Ventures initially funded the company. Selina Lo was the first CEO of the company, and continued until company's acquisition by Brocade Communications in 2016.

Ruckus initially focused on in-home IPTV content distribution over wireless. In 2007, it introduced a miniaturized wireless multimedia adapter, the MediaFlex USB Dongle, designed to provide wireless connectivity to in-home multimedia devices such as set-tops and media center systems. At the 2007 CES event, Ruckus demonstrated a dongle with Motorola set top box VIP1720.

On September 19, 2005, Ruckus announced that it had secured $9 million in its second round of financing, which increased total investment in the company to over $14 million since its formation in June 2004. Sutter Hill Ventures and Investor Growth Capital, the venture capital arm of Investor AB of Sweden, led the new financing. Existing investors Sequoia Capital and WK Technology Fund completed the oversubscribed round. WK Technology Fund led the $3.5 million first round of financing, while Sequoia Capital and private investors provided the initial $1.5 million of seed money.

Ruckus Wireless appointed Wen Ko, founding managing director of WK Technology Fund, to its board of directors. The board also included Dominic Orr, chairman and former CEO of Alteon WebSystems and Aruba Networks; Selina Lo, president and CEO; Gaurav Garg, former founder of Redback Networks and partner at Sequoia Capital; and Bill Kish, CTO and co-founder of Ruckus Wireless.

=== Company growth ===
In January 2005, Ruckus announced that the company had signed a worldwide agreement to license its BeamFlex technology to Netgear for the RangeMax product line.

In April 2008, Ruckus introduced ZoneDirector 3000, an enterprise WLAN controller; FlexMaster, a remote centralized Wi-Fi management system; and SmartMesh on its 802.11n access point.

In 2008, Ruckus shifted focus on enterprise, carrier SP, education and hospitality verticals with ZoneDirector controllers, which are built on technology acquired from Airspider.

In 2009, Ruckus entered into Metro-Wi-Fi with an outdoor mesh system.

==== Dispute ====
In 2008, Ruckus sued Netgear, along with its new MIMO antenna supplier Rayspan, for patent infringement, over the antenna designs and associated software that replaced the Beamflex technology which Netgear used to buy from Ruckus. Netgear licensed BeamFlex adaptive antenna to use in its RangeMax 824 v1 and v2 wireless routers. For RangeMax 824 v3 routers, Netgear used Rayspan-made antennas, which violated patents by Ruckus.

In 2010, three months after purchasing '454 and '143 patents from Adaptix Corporation., Netgear sued Ruckus for patent infringement. Netgear alleged that Ruckus' Wi-Fi access points equipped with Ruckus' BeamFlex and ChannelFly technology infringed the '454 and '143 patents. Netgear also asserted claims for induced infringement and contributory infringement, alleging that Ruckus knowingly and intentionally caused Ruckus' customers to infringe the asserted patents. On 4 November 2013, the Delaware jury returned a verdict of non-infringement for Ruckus, finding that Netgear failed to establish that any of the Ruckus accused products infringed the asserted claims of the ’454 and ’143 patents.

==== Further technology and products development ====
On May 24, 2010, Ruckus announced that it had been granted a Wi-Fi Security Patent for Dynamic Authentication and Encryption by the United States Patent and Trademark Office. This patent is based on a technology developed by Ruckus called Dynamic Pre Shared Key, which require unique security keys to each WLAN user while Pre Shared Keys requires all user of WLAN to use same security key. The technology also aims to dynamically generate security keys and provision. On May 20, 2013, Ruckus introduced a follow-up technology to DPSK called 'Zero-IT Activation' to provision unique security keys to client devices by a small agent-like software.

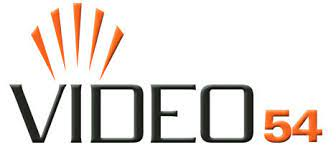
Logo of Video54 Technologies before changing its name to Ruckus Wireless Inc.

Ruckus unveiled their switching portfolio on June 21, 2010, named ZoneSwitch Series of Switches. ZoneSwitch Series had two models, 4124 and 4224, 24 Port Ethernet RJ-45 PoE switches and fiber uplinks, with 180Watts and 375Watts power budget respectively. On the same day, Ruckus introduced a new wall switch access point, ZoneFlex 7025, which fits compactly into a wall jack junction box and provides additional switch ports. Ruckus aims to provide multi-service using this access point, and claims it is the industry's first wall jack/wall switch/wall jack access point.

Former logo of Ruckus Networks, an ARRIS company, from 2018 through 2019

On Jan 27, 2012, Ruckus opened a new R&D center in Diamond District Office Building, Bangalore, India operations will be the company's first development centre in India, joining the company's four other R&D centres in Taiwan (Taipei), China (Shenzhen), Israel (Tel Aviv), and US (Sunnyvale, CA). With 2013 YFind's acquisition, a R&D center in Singapore also added.

=== IPO and awards ===
Ruckus went public on the New York Stock Exchange on November 16, 2012, under the symbol RKUS.

On 12 June 2012, In an awards gala in London, Global Telecoms Business recognized Ruckus and Tikona Digital Networks for building world's largest outdoor wireless mesh network in India, naming the companies the winner of its 2012 Broadband Wireless Access Innovation award. Tikona network consisted of over 40,000 Ruckus ZoneFlex access points across 30 cities.

IDC MarketScape: Worldwide Enterprise WLAN 2013-2014 Vendor Analysis (doc #243354, September 2013) announced that Ruckus is named as leader in WLAN market. The report named three vendors as leaders: Cisco, Ruckus, and Aruba.

=== Acquisitions and mergers ===
In 2006, the company acquired AirSpider Networks.

In October 2011, the company acquired the India development centre of Intellinet Technologies Inc. Later that year, they acquired ComAbility.

In 2013, Ruckus acquired YFind Technologies Private Limited.

In 2015, the company acquired Cloudpath Networks.

On April 4, 2016, it was announced that Brocade Communications Systems had agreed to acquire Ruckus for $1.5 billion. The deal was completed on May 27, 2016.

In November 2016, Broadcom announced their intention to acquire Brocade for $5.9 billion. The deal was finalized on November 21, 2017. Broadcom said it would retain Brocade's Fibre Channel SAN switching business and divest Brocade's IP networking business – including the recently acquired Ruckus Wireless.

In February 2017, Arris International announced that it would acquire Broadcom's Ruckus Wireless and ICX® Switch businesses for $800 million. The deal was completed on December 1, 2017.

In November 2018 it was announced that CommScope would purchase Arris group including Ruckus Networks, for $7.4 billion. The acquisition was completed in April 2019.

On April 30, 2026, it was announced that Belden Inc. would purchase Ruckus Networks for $1.85 billion.

=== 2018–present ===
At MWC2018 at Barcelona, Ruckus Networks announced the new CBRS LTE portfolio. U.S. Citizens Broadband Radio Service (CBRS) 3.5 GHz LTE access points and related cloud subscription services were introduced by Ruckus to enable enterprises to deploy private LTE network. Ruckus conducted live demonstration at MWC'18.

In December 2019, it was reported that a security researcher had found several vulnerabilities in the web user interface software that runs on a number of Ruckus Wireless routers, which the company had since patched.

== Technology ==
Ruckus designed an adaptive directional antenna technology called BeamFlex, and sold the technology to other manufacturers to enable them to include it in their products. Ruckus also came out with a Customer Premises Equipment (CPE) device that was sold to service providers.

Ruckus offers WiFi products such as indoor and outdoor access points, including BeamFlex, which has smart antenna technology, and automatically adjusts to changes in the Radio Frequency (RF) environment providing stronger signals. Beamforming was integrated into the version of the 802.11 standard and 802.11ac. Ruckus introduced BeamFlex+ with Polarization Diversity Maximal Ration Combining (PD-MRC) to handle complex wireless environment and it was an upgraded technology of BeamFlex.

Ruckus ICX Switches offers Campus Fabric technology in FastIron Operation system across all portfolio of switches. It is based on IEEE 802.1BR standard for network automation and management simplicity.

Other products that Ruckus offers include controllers, software, and smart wireless services.

== Products and services ==
Ruckus Networks designs, sells and services IT networking products, such as switches, WLAN controller, access points, IoT gateways and software. Ruckus started as a wireless only company selling to Internet service providers, hotel chains, large public venues and later extended to education.

== Industries served ==
=== Enterprises ===
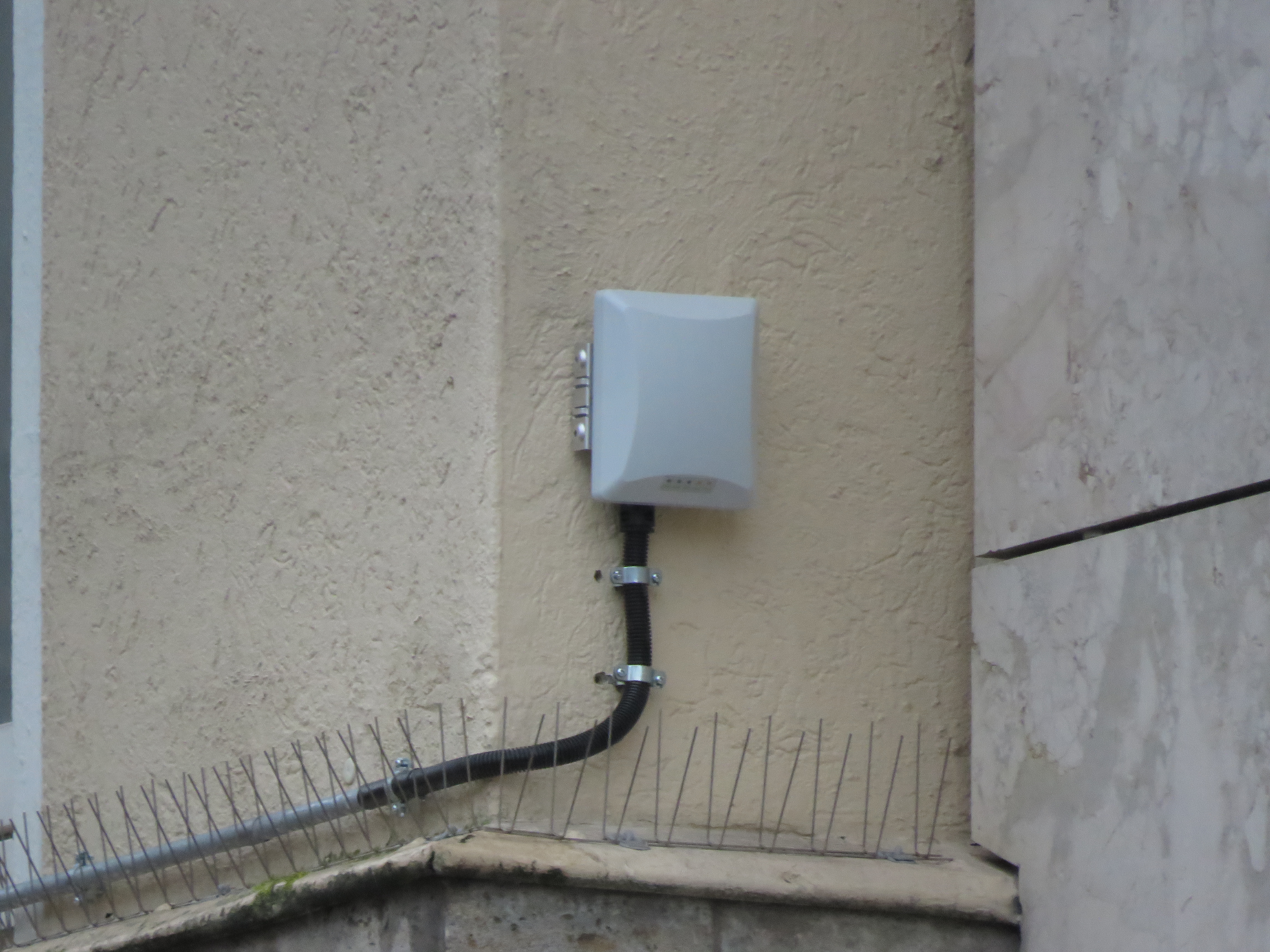
Ruckus T300 at Flensburg City Hotspot

Ruckus relies heavily on its enterprise business, as it is two-thirds of their revenue with almost 100% of enterprise sales coming from the channel. Many of these enterprises include hospitality, retail, healthcare, transportation hubs, and education.

=== Carriers ===
Ruckus Wireless started out by selling to carrier companies and they are still a good portion of their business. Their customers include C3ntro Telecom, Verizon, AT&T, Time Warner Cable, Deutsche Telekom, and China Telecom. One-third of Ruckus' business is selling to carrier businesses.
