= Gregory Reyes =

American businessman (born 1962)

- Born: September 1, 1962 (age 64)
- Education: Saint Mary's College of California
- Occupation: Businessman
- Known for: first person convicted for fraudulent backdating of corporate stock options
- Criminal charge: securities fraud
- Criminal penalty: 18 months in prison, $15 million fine
- Criminal status: pardoned by Donald Trump

Gregory Reyes (born September 1, 1962) is an American businessman who was the chief executive officer (CEO) for Brocade Communications. He is the first person to have been convicted for fraudulent backdating of corporate stock options.

== Education and business career ==
After graduating from high school, Reyes attended Saint Mary's College of California in Moraga, California, where he obtained a degree in Business Administration in 1984. During his studies there, Reyes obtained an internship with Convergent Technologies (Unisys) in its sales department. Reyes began working full-time position at Convergent while taking evening classes in order to complete his degree. After obtaining his degree, Reyes became an OEM sales representative for Convergent, then left to become Vice President of Sales and Support at Banyan Systems, a networking and data communications software firm.

Reyes obtained his first CEO position with Wireless Access, a Silicon Valley start-up company specializing in two-way pagers. Reyes was president and CEO until Wireless Access was bought out in 1997 by Glenayre Technologies.

In 1998, Reyes became the CEO of Brocade Communications, where he led the company to its initial public offering in 1999. As CEO of Brocade Communications, Reyes sold SAN (storage area network) infrastructure to a number of companies, including IBM, EMC Corp., Compaq, Dell, NEC, and HP.

During Reyes's time as CEO, Brocade was the largest manufacturer of networking equipment that provides data storage in the world. Under his leadership, the company went public in May 1999, growing from a small startup business into one of the largest and most successful technology companies in the Silicon Valley—a leadership position that it maintains to this day. Brocade showed 7 quarters of profitability and revenue growth during that time—in the first two years alone, revenue growth exceeded 150% altogether. In addition, Reyes actively pursued the recruitment of more than 1,150 employees, multiplying the company's workforce by a factor greater than six from 1999 to 2002 until the company implemented massive layoffs in response to the burst of the dot-com bubble.

Reyes resigned from Brocade when he was indicted by the U.S. government for accounting irregularities associated with corporate stock options backdating. Reyes was originally convicted in 2007, but the conviction was overturned on appeal. He was retried in 2010, and again convicted; the second conviction was upheld on appeal.

Reyes is the first corporate official to be convicted of concealing stock options backdating in the United States.

== Stock option backdating issue ==
=== Charges ===
In June 2005, Brocade announced that the U.S. Securities and Exchange Commission had undertaken an investigation into the company stock option accounting. In August 2006, the U.S. government indicted Reyes on 12 counts of securities fraud, two of which were later dropped.

=== First trial ===
Reyes's trial began on June 18, 2007, making it the first criminal trial in which a backdating prosecution was considered before a jury.

In the trial, Reyes stated that he had no intent to deceive anyone, and that his decisions relied largely in good faith on the accuracy of documentation provided by Brocade's finance department, which incorrectly accounted for stock options in Brocade's financial statements that he signed in good faith and with the belief that they had been properly accounted for.

Elizabeth Moore, a key witness to Reyes's conviction and the only employee of Brocade's finance department to be called during the proceedings, testified that neither she nor any other members of the finance department had any knowledge of backdating or fraudulent occurrences within the organization. After the trial's conclusion, however, Moore recanted her testimony, claiming that she had been bullied and pressured by the prosecution to give false testimony. In a letter to Fortune Magazine she told an editor that she, as well as other high-ranking members of the finance department, had been aware of the practice of backdating stock options to rank-and-file employees.

Moore's conflicting statements were not disclosed during the trial, and prosecutor Adam Reeves made numerous statements to the jury using Moore's testimony to support his argument that Reyes had deceived Brocade's finance department; he presented a diagram to illustrate that no one in the finance department was aware of the backdating; he made statements in his closing arguments claiming that employees of the finance department did not have any idea that the backdating had occurred, adding that the government's theory, based on their investigational findings, supported this conclusion.

Reyes filed a motion for a new trial on the grounds of prosecutorial misconduct, which was denied by the district court. On January 16, 2008, Reyes was found guilty of 10 counts of fraud and conspiracy, including falsifying corporate accounting books and records, and participating in a stock options backdating scheme. Reyes was sentenced to 21 months in prison in addition to a $15 million fine, making him the first executive to be convicted of the concealment of stock options backdating.

On August 11, 2007 Reyes was convicted on 10 counts of illegally backdating stock options while CEO of Brocade. In January 2008, he was sentenced to 21 months in prison and received a $15 million fine. U.S. District Judge Charles R. Breyer, the sentencing judge, refused to grant the defense request for a sentence of no more than 13 months, to be served in a halfway house rather than prison.

=== Appeal ===
In August 2009, the Ninth Circuit Court of Appeals reversed Reyes's conviction due to prosecutorial misconduct in making a false assertion of material fact in its closing argument to the jury. In October 2009, federal prosecutors requested the Ninth Circuit to strike its finding of prosecutorial misconduct, but declined to request that the court reverse the judgment itself; that request was denied November 6. In December 2009, Northern California legal newspaper The Recorder reported that prosecutors had reached a decision to retry Reyes.

In the appeal, the National Association of Criminal Defense Lawyers had supported Reyes with an amicus brief urging reversal. Reyes was represented in the appeal by former U.S. Solicitor General Seth Waxman.

=== Second trial and appeal ===
Reyes's second backdating trial (or retrial) commenced on February 22, 2010, in U.S. District Judge Charles Breyer's court room. Reyes was charged with 1 count of falsifying books and records, 4 counts of lying to auditors, 4 counts of security fraud, and 1 count of conspiracy.

On March 26, 2010, the jury found Reyes guilty on 9 charges and was acquitted on the conspiracy charge. Reyes's attorney stated that Reyes will likely file another appeal. On June 24, 2010, Reyes was sentenced to 18 months' incarceration and a $15 million fine. Reyes was incarcerated at the Taft Correctional Institution in Taft, California; he was released on December 29, 2011. He appealed this second conviction to the Court of Appeals for the Ninth Circuit, which heard oral argument on May 10, 2011. The court affirmed the conviction October 13. On February 10, 2012, Reyes petitioned the U.S. Supreme Court for a writ of certiorari, asking the court to review the case. The petition was denied the following month.

=== Civil proceedings ===
In addition to the criminal proceeding, Reyes has also been named in several civil lawsuits in state and federal courts, stemming from the backdating, including one federal suit filed by the U.S. Securities and Exchange Commission, which he settled in August 2011 for $845,000. Reyes settled one of the other suits, a derivative suit brought by Brocade shareholders on behalf of the company, in June 2009, for a reported $12.5 million.

After Reyes was released from prison, and after his probation had ended, he attempted to purchase a handgun, and was denied when the background check revealed that he was a convicted felon. In 2017, Reyes sued for a declaration that his conviction was for a crime excluded from the Gun Control Act of 1968. In 2018, U.S. District Court Judge John D. Bates ruled in favor of Reyes.

=== Full pardon ===
On January 20, 2021, Reyes was granted a full pardon by President Trump.

President Trump granted a full pardon to Greg Reyes. This pardon is supported by Shon Hopwood, former United States Attorney Brett Tolman, and numerous others. Mr. Reyes was the former CEO of Brocade Communications. Mr. Reyes was convicted of securities fraud. The Ninth Circuit Court of Appeals, however, threw out his convictions, finding prosecutorial misconduct. He was later retried, convicted, and sentenced to 18 months in Federal prison. Mr. Reyes has accepted full responsibility for his actions and has been out of prison for more than 8 years.

When asked how he secured the pardon in an interview on Clubhouse on March 1, 2021 in the club "A16Z BIO", Reyes said he had reached out to several people that he believed may have been able to help him get a pardon. These included un-named friends of friends that played golf with President Trump, Shon Hopwood, Brett Tolman, David Horowitz and Fox News anchor Maria Bartiromo, who was in regular contact with President Trump. Reyes didn't say or seem to know which approach worked, but ultimately he did receive the pardon.
