= Fabric OS =

- Developer: Broadcom
- Working state: Current
- Source model: Closed source
- Latest release: 10.0.1a / November 4, 2026; 7 days ago
- Supported platforms: Broadcom Fibre Channel switches/directors
- Default user interface: Command-line interface
- Official website: FOS - Fabric Operating System

In storage area networking, Fabric OS (FOS) is the firmware for Brocade's Fibre Channel switches and directors.

== First generation ==
The first generation of Fabric OS was developed on top of a VxWorks kernel and was mainly used in the Brocade Silkworm 2000 and first 3000 series on Intel i960.

== Second generation ==
The second generation of Fabric OS (4.0) was developed on a PowerPC platform, and uses MontaVista Linux, a Linux derivative with real-time performance enhancements. With the advent of MontaVista, switches and directors have the ability of hot firmware activation (without downtime for Fibre Channel fabric), and many useful diagnostic commands.

According to free software licenses terms, Brocade provides access to sources of distributed free software, on which Fabric OS and other Brocade's software products are based.

== Additional licensed products ==
Additional products for Fabric OS are offered by Brocade for one-time fee. They are licensed for use in a single specific switch (license key is coupled with device's serial number). Those include:

- Integrated Routing
- Adaptive Networking: Quality of service, Ingress Rate Limiting
- Brocade Advanced Zoning (Free with rel 6.1.x)
- ISL trunking
- Ports on Demand
- Extended Fabrics (more than 10 km of switched fabric connectivity, up to 3000 km)
- Advanced Performance Monitoring (APM)
- Fabric Watch
- Secure Fabric OS (obsolete)
- VMWare VSPEX integration

== Versions ==
Fabric OS current "Posted" versions
Major Version (Date)	Version	GA Date	Target Path	FICON Qualified	Posting Status	Notes
10.0 (September 2025)	10.0.1a	November 4, 2026		Yes	Posted	Compatible only with Gen 7, and mandatory for Gen 8 platforms
10.0 (September 2025)	10.0.0a1	May 20, 2026		Yes	Posted	Compatible only with Gen 7, and mandatory for Gen 8 platforms
9.2.2 (October 2024)	9.2.2d2	October 28, 2026	Yes	Yes	Posted (LW)	
9.2.1 (December 2023)	9.2.1c3	January 21, 2026	Yes	Retired	Posted	
9.2.0 (April 2023)	9.2.0c5	January 21, 2026	Yes	Retired	Posted	
8.2 (November 2017)	8.2.3f	November 11, 2025	Yes	Yes	Posted	Available for and supported on designated Gen 5 platforms only
Legend: Supported Latest version LW = Lifetime Warranty platforms

- Fabric OS 10
  - 10.0
- Fabric OS 9
  - 9.2.2:
  - 9.2.1:
  - 9.2.0:
  - 9.1: Root Access Removal, NTP Server authentication
  - 9.0: Traffic optimizer, Fabric congestion notification, New Web Tools (graphical UI switched from Java to Web)
- Fabric OS 8
  - 8.2: NVMe capable + REST API
  - 8.1:
  - 8.0: Contains many new software features and enhancements as well as issue resolutions
- Fabric OS 7
  - 7.4: Switch to Linux 3.10 kernel
  - 7.3:
  - 7.2:
  - 7.1:
  - 7.0:
- Fabric OS 6
  - 6.4:
  - 6.3: Fillwords 2 and 3 introduced in Fabric OS 6.3.1a
  - 6.2: Virtual Fabrics-capable
  - 6.1: M-EOS compatibility enhancements
  - 6.0: LDAP support
- Fabric OS 5
  - 5.3: Switch to Linux 2.6 kernel
  - 5.2:
  - 5.1: Access Gateway mode
  - 5.0:
- Fabric OS 4
  - 4.4:
  - 4.3:
  - 4.2:
  - 4.1: SSH support, Multiple user access
  - 4.0: migrated from VxWorks to Linux
- Fabric OS 3
- Fabric OS 2
