= Gen 5 Fibre Channel =

Gen 5 Fibre Channel is the marketing name for purpose-built, data center network infrastructure for storage that provides reliability, scalability and up to 16 Gbit/s performance adopted by Brocade, Emulex, and QLogic. The name was created to move away from speed-based naming to technology generation-based naming. Gen 5 Fibre Channel is based on the 5th generation of (1, 2, 4, 8, 16 Gbit/s).

== Brocade Gen 5 Fibre Channel ==
Brocade formally introduced the term "Gen 5 Fibre Channel" in a press release announcing Brocade Fabric Vision Technology. Brocade has a broad range of Gen 5 Fibre Channel platforms spanning from director-class switches (Brocade DCX 8510), to fixed-port switches (Brocade 6520/6510/6505), to embedded switches, and adapters (Brocade 1860 Fabric Adapter).

Brocade platforms with Gen 5 Fibre Channel are positioned for high-density server virtualization, cloud architectures, and next generation flash and SSD storage.

== Emulex Gen 5 Fibre Channel ==
Emulex first introduced Gen 5 Fibre Channel in a press release announcing ecosystem and partner adoption of Gen 5 Fibre Channel HBAs for flash storage and SAN appliances. In conjunction, the Emulex LightPulse LPe1600B HBAs were re-positioned as "The PCI Express (PCIe) 3.0 LPe16000B Gen 5 Fibre Channel (16GFC/8GFC/4GFC) Host Bus Adapters"

== QLogic Gen 5 Fibre Channel ==
QLogic first introduced Gen 5 Fibre Channel in during the Q1 2013 earnings call on July 25, 2013. In conjunction, the QLogic 2600 Series HBAs were repositioned as "2600 Series 16 Gb Gen 5 Fibre Channel Adapters".

== Cisco Gen 5 Fibre Channel ==
Cisco has not adopted the Gen 5 Fibre Channel branding.

== Other sources adopting the Gen 5 Fibre Channel name ==
In an IDC Link report from March 26, 2013, analyst Ashish Nadkarni provided an assessment of Brocade's March 25 product launch

Dell'Oro Senior Analyst Casey Quillin started using Gen 5 Fibre Channel in his Fibre Channel Switch reports starting in March 2013.

== Gen 5 Fibre Channel Controversy ==
There have been heated debates within the industry about the usage of Gen 5 Fibre Channel as the marketing name for 16 Gbit/s Fibre Channel. After Emulex launched their rebranded HBAs with the Gen 5 Fibre Channel branding, the Register's Chris Mellor captured this debate in an article about the controversy. Since the article was posted, QLogic began using the Gen 5 Fibre Channel name as well.
