= CommScope =

American network infrastructure manufacturer

CommScope Holding Company, Inc.

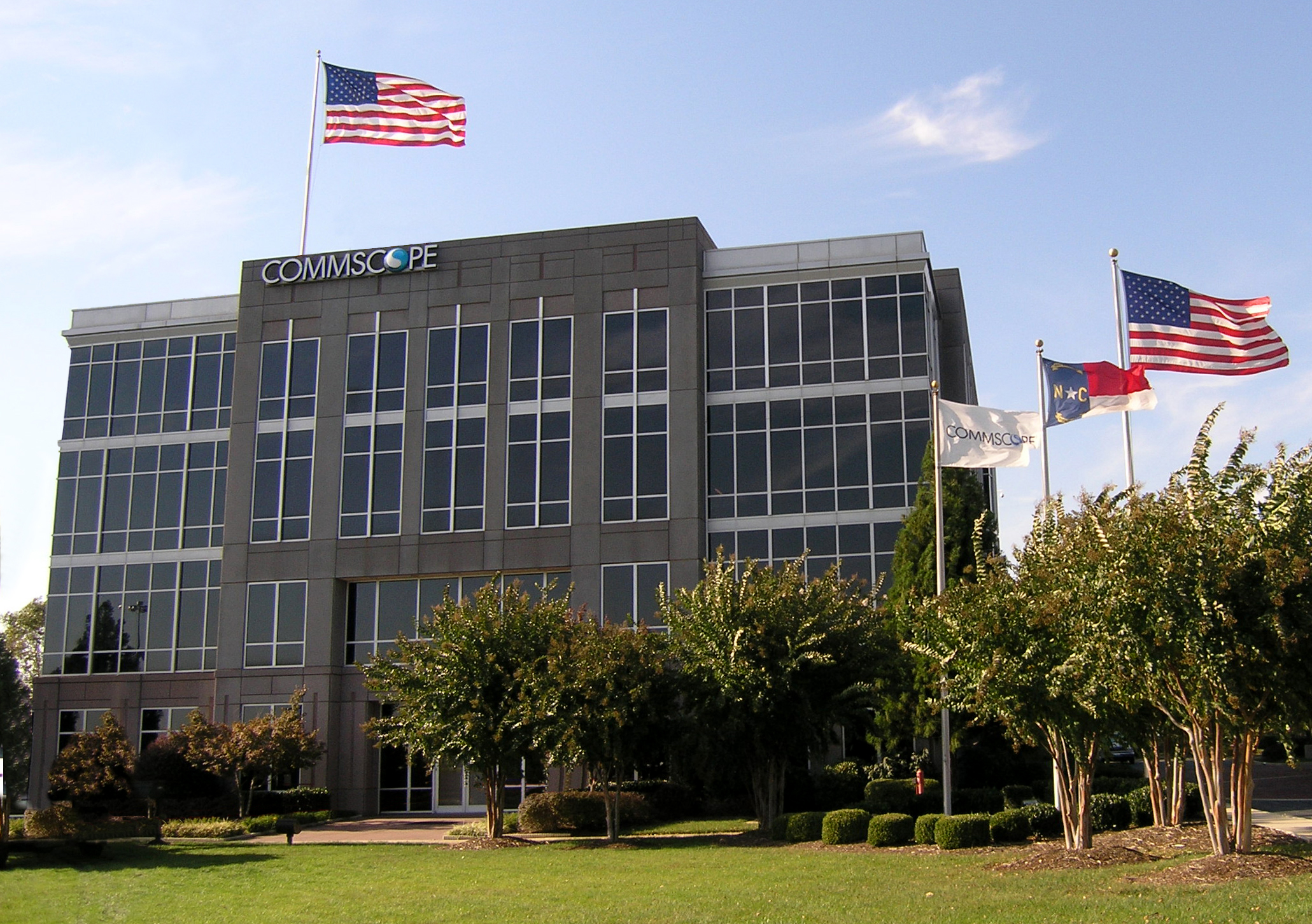
- Former headquarters in Hickory, North Carolina
- Type: Public
- Traded as: Nasdaq: COMM; Russell 2000 component
- Industry: Telecommunications
- Founded: 1976; 50 years ago, in Hickory, North Carolina, U.S.
- Founder: Frank M. Drendel
- Headquarters: Claremont, North Carolina, U.S.
- Key people: Claudius Watts; (chairman); Charles Treadway; (president and CEO)
- Brands: RUCKUS; NetConnect; SYSTIMAX; Uniprise; ERA; HELIAX; ONECELL
- Revenue: ▼US$4.21 billion (2024)
- Operating income: ▲US$257 million (2024)
- Net income: ▲US$−316 million (2024)
- Total assets: ▼US$8.75 billion (2024)
- Total equity: ▼US$−3.5 billion (2024)
- Number of employees: 20,000 (2024)
- Website: commscope.com

CommScope Holding Company, Inc. is an American network infrastructure provider based in Claremont, North Carolina. CommScope employs over 22,000 employees. The company joined the Nasdaq stock exchange on October 25, 2013.

CommScope designs and manufactures network infrastructure products through its business segments: broadband networks, venue and campus Networks, and outdoor wireless networks.

== History ==
CommScope was originally a product line of Superior Continental Cable, which was founded in 1953 in Hickory, North Carolina. In 1961, Superior created a division called Comm/Scope, which developed CATV systems and sold a coaxial cable named CommScope. In 1967, Superior was acquired by Continental Telephone Company, with CommScope becoming a division of Continental. In 1975, Frank Drendel headed a team charged with selling the product line. Drendel and Jearld Leonhardt founded CommScope in August 1976 after raising $5.1 million to purchase the CommScope product line. Two years later, CommScope and Valtech merged under the Valtech name. In 1979 Valtech donated fiber optics line and equipment to link the U.S. House of Representatives to the C-SPAN studios, enabling live broadcasting of U.S. Congressional proceedings for the first time.

In the 1980s, Valtech sold to M/A-COM, and CommScope became part of the Cable Home Group for M/A-COM. In 1983, CommScope formed the Network Cable division for the local area network, data communications, television-receive only, and specialized wire markets. In 1986 M/A-COM, sold the Cable Home Group to General Instrument Corporation, and CommScope became a division of General Instrument.

In 1997, General Instrument split into three independent, publicly-traded companies, with its cable operation spun off as CommScope. At the time, CommScope had annual revenues of $560 million and was the largest provider of coaxial cable to cable TV operators.

In 2000, CommScope opened its new global headquarters in Hickory, North Carolina. In 2004, CommScope acquired Avaya's Connectivity Solutions cabling unit and inherited the SYSTIMAX brand, a company perhaps best known for its enterprise cabling systems. Avaya's Carrier Solutions, which offered products designed for switching and transmission applications in telephone central offices and secure environmental enclosures, also became part of CommScope. This acquisition doubled CommScope's size. In 2007, CommScope acquired the global wireless infrastructure provider Andrew Corporation, which would help CommScope meet demand from mobile phone companies.

In 2008, CommScope was chosen to provide the Dallas Cowboys with the connectivity for their new stadium starting with the 2009 NFL season, using over 5 million feet of copper and fiber-optic cabling.

In 2011, The Carlyle Group acquired CommScope. This acquisition made CommScope privately owned by The Carlyle Group and removed it from the New York Stock Exchange. Eddie Edwards was appointed president and chief executive officer, succeeding Frank Drendel, who had served as CommScope's CEO since the company's founding in 1976. Drendel continued as the chairman of the board.

On October 25, 2013, CommScope had its initial public offering on the NASDAQ, being listed as COMM.

In February 2016, it was announced that the Daytona International Speedway had a new wiring infrastructure from CommScope. In June 2016, CommScope was signed by the Carolina Panthers to upgrade the wireless and wired communications at the team's Bank of America Stadium.

In November 2016, the Carlyle Group announced the sale of its remaining shares of CommScope.

In 2019, for the Hong Kong-Zhuhai-Macao Bridge, a 55 kilometer bridge-tunnel system, CommScope supplied over 110 multiband antennas supporting 2G, 3G, and 4G network bands.

In 2020, CommScope broke into the Fortune 500 rankings for the first time, coming in at the number 381 spot.

On October 1, 2020, CommScope announced that Charles Treadway would succeed Eddie Edwards as the company's new president and CEO. The company also announced that Bud Watts would replace Frank Drendel as chairman, with Drendel being named chairman emeritus.

In November 2023, CommScope moved its headquarters from Hickory, to nearby Claremont, North Carolina.

In 2024, it fell from the Fortune 500 rankings, coming in at the number 503 spot.

In May 2025, CommScope launched its XPND modular fiber termination platform which features interchangeable panels and cassettes, allowing service providers to customize configurations and expand capacity as needed. In November 2025, CommScope moved their headquarters to Richardson, Texas.

== Acquisitions ==
In 2004, the company acquired Avaya's connectivity business, including the legacy intellectual property and patents from Western Electric, AT&T, Lucent Technologies, and Avaya.

In June 2007, CommScope acquired Andrew Corporation for $2.6 billion. Andrew's products included antennas, cables, amplifiers, repeaters, transceivers, as well as software and training for the broadband and cellular industries.

In 2015, CommScope acquired TE Connectivity's Broadband Network Solutions (BNS) division. Later in 2015 CommScope acquired Airvana, a privately held company specializing in small cell solutions for wireless networks.

On April 4, 2019, CommScope completed the acquisition of Arris International, a telecommunications equipment manufacturing company and owner of Ruckus Networks. Both Arris and Ruckus were made brands of CommScope.

In October 2020, CommScope acquired the patent portfolio for virtual radio access networks (vRAN) from Phluido, a company specializing in RAN virtualization and disaggregation.

== Divestments ==
In October 2023, CommScope sold its home networks division to Vantiva for a 25% stake in Vantiva.

In August 2025, Amphenol agreed to buy CommScope's connectivity and cable business unit for $10.5 billion, to offset its debt load. The acquisition, which included CommScope trademark and logo rights, was completed on January 12, 2026. The remaining rest of the company adopted the Vistance Networks name.
