= Airvana =

- Type: Part of CommScope
- Industry: Small cell, Femtocell, Wireless broadband, Mobile Broadband
- Founded: March 2000
- Headquarters: Chelmsford, Massachusetts USA
- Website: www.commscope.com

Airvana was acquired by CommScope in 2015. Prior to that, the company was an independent provider of small cells and femtocells based on fourth generation (4G) Long Term Evolution (LTE) and third-generation (3G) CDMA2000 EV-DO mobile broadband technologies. Airvana products enable mobile operators to deliver 3G and 4G cellular data services indoors.

== About ==
Airvana was founded in 2000 by Motorola executives Sanjeev Verma and Vedat Eyuboglu. The company went public in July 2007 on the NASDAQ: AIRV and was taken private in 2009 for $530M by management and private equity investors. In 2013, Ericssson Inc acquired Airvana's 3G EVDO business and in 2015 CommScope acquired Airvana's Femtocell Business . Airvana's 3G CDMA2000 EVDO infrastructure business was ranked #2 in worldwide marketshare and in 2011 its Femtocell business was ranked #1 in worldwide marketshare.

Airvana provides technology for mobile networks to support mobile broadband information, communication and entertainment services. Airvana’s small cell and femtocell products are small cellular access points that connect to a mobile operator’s network through broadband (such as DSL, fiber or cable) internet connections. They are designed to improve coverage for mobile phone users inside buildings. Airvana’s femtocells currently support LTE and CDMA mobile networks. A previous UMTS femtocell product was disbanded in September 2010.

On March 20, 2013, Airvana Network Solutions Inc. was granted a preliminary injunction in its 330-md intellectual-property lawsuit against Ericsson AB, the world’s largest maker of wireless networks. On September 6, 2013, Airvana sold its EV-DO macro-cell radio access network business unit to Ericsson, retaining its small cell business.

In April 2014 former Nortel executive Richard Lowe was hired as CEO, replacing Randy Battat who remained as chairman of the board.

In June 2014 Airvana announced OneCell, an LTE small cell system based on Cloud RAN (C-RAN) technology for large indoor spaces. In February 2015 Airvana announced the Device Management System (DMS), a small cell management system.

== Awards ==
- 2015 Airvana’s OneCell was awarded Outstanding Overall Mobile Technology – The CTO’s Choice, in the GSMA’s Global Mobile Awards
- 2015 Airvana’s OneCell was awarded Best Mobile Technology Breakthrough in the GSMA’s Global Mobile Awards
- 2015 and 2014 Airvana was classified as a Visionary by Gartner Group in the Magic Quadrant for Small Cell Equipment
- 2014 Airvana’s OneCell was named the winner of the CTIA Emerging Technology (E-Tech) Award for In-Building Wireless – Small Cell, Wi-Fi, LAN
- 2008 Airvana's CDMA HubBub Femtocell was named a finalist in the CTIA Emerging Technology (E-Tech) Awards - Network Infrastructure - In-Building/Local Area Network Solution Category.
- 2008 Airvana ranked among top 50 New England Cool Companies in the Innovation Economy “Cool Half-Hundred” Companies.
- 2007 Airvana Ranked among Top U.S. Wireless IPOs in 2007
- 2007 Airvana Ranked Number Four in Deloitte's Technology Fast 50 List for New England
- 2006 Airvana was named Company of the Year by the Massachusetts Network Communications Council, for the second time in a row. Also received the award for fastest growth in Massachusetts.
- 2005 Randy Battat named CEO of the Year by the Massachusetts Network Communications Council.
- 2004 Randy Battat named winner of the Ernst & Young Entrepreneur Of The Year 2004 Award (Technology category for New England).
- Airvana named recipient of the Dow Jones VentureWire Investors Choice award 2003 Airvana recipient of the Network Technology Innovation award by the CDMA Development Group (CDG)
- Airvana honored as one of “The Fierce 15” Top Wireless Startups of the Year by FierceWireless

== Offices ==
CommScope headquarters are in Hickory, North Carolina, USA.
