= Virtual Cluster Switching =

Layer 2 proprietary Ethernet technology

Virtual Cluster Switching (VCS) fabric technology is a Layer 2 proprietary Ethernet technology from Brocade Communications Systems, later acquired by Extreme Networks. It is designed to improve network utilization, maximize application availability, increase scalability, and simplify the network architecture in virtualized data centers.

== Ethernet Fabrics ==
Ethernet fabrics encompasses Data Center Bridging (DCB) technologies, IEEE 802.1aq and the emerging IETF standard, Transparent Interconnection of Lots of Links (TRILL), to provide a more efficient way of moving data throughout the network. An Ethernet fabric is promoted for Fibre Channel over Ethernet (FCoE) and iSCSI storage traffic.

Ethernet fabrics have the following characteristics:

1. Flatter: Ethernet fabrics are self-aggregating, enabling a flatter network.
2. Intelligent: Switches in the fabric know about each other and all connected devices.
3. Scalable: All paths are available for high performance and high reliability.
4. Efficient: Traffic automatically travels along the shortest path.
5. Simple: The fabric is managed as a single logical entity.

Brocade markets using the term "Ethernet fabric". Brocade SAN fabric technology is currently deployed in over 90 percent of the Global 1000 data centers. With VCS Fabric technology, Brocade will be bringing the same level of innovation to the data center LAN environment.

== Distributed intelligence ==
With VCS Fabric technology, all configuration and destination information is distributed to each member switch in the fabric. For example, when a server connects to the fabric for the first time, all switches in the fabric learn about that server. Also, when two VCS-enabled switches are connected, the fabric is automatically created, and the switches discover the common fabric configuration. This fabric configuration is shared amongst all of the switches in the fabric, making it masterless, so no single switch stores configuration information or controls fabric operations.

Distributed intelligence enables the automatic migration of port profiles (AMPP) which ensures that the source and destination network ports have the same configuration when virtual machines migrate.

== Logical chassis ==
All switches in an Ethernet fabric are managed as if they were a single logical chassis. To the rest of the network, the fabric looks no different than any other single Layer 2 switch. Each physical switch in the fabric is managed as if it were a port module in a chassis. This enables fabric scalability without manual configuration. The logical chassis capability significantly reduces management of small-form-factor edge switches. Instead of managing each top-of-rack switch (or switches in blade server chassis) individually, organizations can manage them as one logical chassis, which further optimizes the network in the virtualized data center and will further enable a cloud computing model.

== Dynamic services ==
Dynamic services extend the VCS Fabric technology to incrementally incorporate network services. A dynamic service behaves like a special service module in a modular chassis. Possible fabric services include fabric extension over distance, native Fiber Channel connectivity, Layer 4 - 7 services such as the Brocade application resource broker, and security services such as firewalls and data encryption. Switches can join an Ethernet fabric, adding a network service layer that is available across the entire fabric.

== Availability ==
Brocade announced VCS Fabric technology on June 9, 2010, at its annual Technology Day in New York City. It is available as a licensed feature for the Brocade VDX switch family.
