= Nagle's algorithm =

Means of improving the efficiency of TCP/IP networks

Nagle's algorithm is a means of improving the efficiency of TCP/IP networks by reducing the number of packets that need to be sent over the network. It was defined by John Nagle while working for Ford Aerospace. It was published in 1984 as a Request for Comments (RFC) with title Congestion Control in IP/TCP Internetworks in RFC 896.

The RFC describes what Nagle calls the "small-packet problem", where an application repeatedly emits data in small chunks, frequently only 1 byte in size. Since TCP packets have a 40-byte header (20 bytes for TCP, 20 bytes for IPv4), this results in a 41-byte packet for 1 byte of useful information, a huge overhead. This situation often occurs in Telnet sessions, where most keypresses generate a single byte of data that is transmitted immediately. Worse, over slow links, many such packets can be in transit at the same time, potentially leading to congestion collapse.

Nagle's algorithm works by combining a number of small outgoing messages and sending them all at once. Specifically, as long as there is a sent packet for which the sender has received no acknowledgment, the sender should keep buffering its output until it has a full packet's worth of output, thus allowing output to be sent all at once.

== Algorithm ==
The RFC defines the algorithm as

inhibit the sending of new TCP segments when new outgoing data arrives from the user if any previously transmitted data on the connection remains unacknowledged.

Where MSS is the maximum segment size, the largest segment that can be sent on this connection, and the window size is the currently acceptable window of unacknowledged data, this can be written in pseudocode as

if there is new data to send then
    if the window size ≥ MSS and available data is ≥ MSS then
        send complete MSS segment now
    else
        if there is unconfirmed data still in the pipe then
            enqueue data in the buffer until an acknowledge is received
        else
            send data immediately
        end if
    end if
end if

== Interaction with delayed ACK ==
This algorithm interacts badly with TCP delayed acknowledgments (delayed ACK), a feature introduced into TCP at roughly the same time in the early 1980s, but by a different group. With both algorithms enabled, applications that do two successive writes to a TCP connection, followed by a read that will not be fulfilled until after the data from the second write has reached the destination, experience a constant delay of up to 500 milliseconds, the "ACK delay". It is recommended to disable either, although traditionally it's easier to disable Nagle, since such a switch already exists for real-time applications.

A solution recommended by Nagle, that prevents the algorithm sending premature packets, is by buffering up application writes then flushing the buffer:

The user-level solution is to avoid write–write–read sequences on sockets. Write–read–write–read is fine. Write–write–write is fine. But write–write–read is a killer. So, if you can, buffer up your little writes to TCP and send them all at once. Using the standard UNIX I/O package and flushing write before each read usually works.

Nagle considers delayed ACKs a "bad idea" since the application layer does not usually respond within the delay window (which would allow the ACK to be combined with the response packet). For typical (non-realtime) use cases, he recommends disabling delayed ACK instead of disabling his algorithm, as "quick" ACKs do not incur as much overhead as many small packets do for the same improvement in round-trip time.

=== Disabling either Nagle or delayed ACK ===
TCP implementations usually provide applications with an interface to disable the Nagle algorithm. This is typically called the TCP_NODELAY option. On Microsoft Windows the TcpNoDelay registry switch decides the default. TCP_NODELAY is present since the TCP/IP stack in 4.2BSD of 1983, a stack with many descendants.

The interface for disabling delayed ACK is not consistent among systems. The TCP_QUICKACK flag is available on Linux since 2001 (2.4.4) and potentially on Windows, where the official interface is SIO_TCP_SET_ACK_FREQUENCY.

Setting TcpAckFrequency to 1 in the Windows registry turns off delayed ACK by default. On FreeBSD, the sysctl entry net.inet.tcp.delayed_ack controls the default behavior. No such switch is present in Linux.

=== Large-write case ===
The interaction between delayed ACK and Nagle also extends to larger writes. If the data in a single write spans 2n packets, where there are 2n-1 full-sized TCP segments followed by a partial TCP segment, the original Nagle algorithm would withhold the last packet, waiting for either more data to send (to fill the packet), or the ACK for the previous packet (indicating that all the previous packets have left the network). A delayed ACK would, again, add a maximum of 500 ms before the last packet is sent. This behavior limits performance for non-pipelined stop-and-wait request-response application protocol such as HTTP with persistent connection.

Minshall's modification to Nagle's algorithm makes it such that the algorithm always sends if the last packet is full-sized, only waiting for an acknowledgement when the last packet is partial. The goal was to weaken the incentive for disabling Nagle by taking care of this large-write penalty. Again, disabling delayed ACK on the receiving end would remove the issue completely.

== Interactions with real-time systems ==
Applications that expect real-time responses and low latency can react poorly with Nagle's algorithm. Applications such as networked multiplayer video games or the movement of the mouse in a remotely controlled operating system, expect that actions are sent immediately, while the algorithm purposefully delays transmission, increasing bandwidth efficiency at the expense of one-way latency. For this reason applications with low-bandwidth time-sensitive transmissions typically use TCP_NODELAY to bypass the Nagle-delayed ACK delay.

Another option is to use UDP instead.

== Operating systems implementation ==
Most modern operating systems implement Nagle's algorithms. In AIX, and Windows it is enabled by default and can be disabled on a per-socket basis using the TCP_NODELAY option.
