= Arris International =

Telecommunications equipment manufacturing brand

Arris International Limited
- Industry: Telecommunications
- Founded: 1995
- Defunct: 2019
- Fate: Acquired by CommScope
- Headquarters: Suwanee, United States
- Website: arris.com at the Wayback Machine (archived 2018-03-16)

Arris International Limited (styled as ARRIS) was an American telecommunications equipment company engaged in data, video and telephony systems for homes and businesses.

On April 4, 2019, Arris was acquired by network infrastructure provider CommScope. Arris now is a brand name by CommScope.

== History ==
Originally named Arris Interactive, the company was founded in 1995 in England and Wales as a joint venture between Nortel Networks and Antec Corp. (founded by Anixter in 1991) Bob Stanzione was the founding president and CEO. Bruce McClelland took over as CEO on September 1, 2016, with Stanzione becoming executive chairman. In 2001, after Antec bought out Nortel's share, the company was renamed Arris Inc, with its executive offices in Suwanee, Georgia, United States.

On November 8, 2018, CommScope announced an agreement to acquire Arris for $7.4 billion. The transaction was completed on April 4, 2019. The acquisition doubled CommScope's size, bringing combined revenues to approximately $11.3 billion. In the transaction, CommScope also acquired Ruckus Networks and ICX Switch, two companies Arris had recently acquired from Broadcom, with Arris and Ruckus becoming brands of CommScope.

Former Arris CEO Bruce McClelland assumed the role of CommScope chief operating officer.

== Products ==
Two of the company's home telephony modems are the TM402P and the TM502G. The firm also produces the SBG6580 wireless cable modem-and-router (residential gateway) unit, among other telecommunications and data-transfer products.

The company has provided products to the Australian National Broadband Network with variants of the Network Termination Device (NBN) that takes the outside connection into the property.

== Acquisitions ==
In November 2001, Arris announced that it would acquire the assets of Cadant Inc., a Naperville, Illinois-based privately held designer and manufacturer of cable modem termination systems. The acquisition was completed on January 31, 2002.

On September 23, 2007, Arris purchased C-COR.

On September 1, 2009, Arris acquired certain assets of EG Technology, Inc., (EGT), an Atlanta-based company. That same month, Arris purchased the assets of Digeo, Inc. (including Moxi), for approximately $20 million.

On October 11, 2011, Arris acquired BigBand Networks, for $172 million, or $53 million net of the estimated cash on hand at BigBand.

On December 19, 2012, Arris announced that it would acquire Motorola Mobility's home unit (the former General Instrument company) from Google for $2.35 billion in cash and stock. The acquisition was completed on April 17, 2013. With that acquisition, Arris grew its presence in the set-top box market.

On April 22, 2015, Arris Group agreed to acquire set-top box manufacturer Pace plc of the United Kingdom, and completed the acquisition on January 4, 2016, in a stock-and-cash deal that valued Pace at £1.4 billion ($2.1 billion). Pace shareholders owned 24% of the combined company, and Arris shareholders 76%.

On February 22, 2017, Arris Group announced an agreement to acquire the Ruckus Wireless unit from Broadcom Inc. for $800 million.

== Sponsorships ==
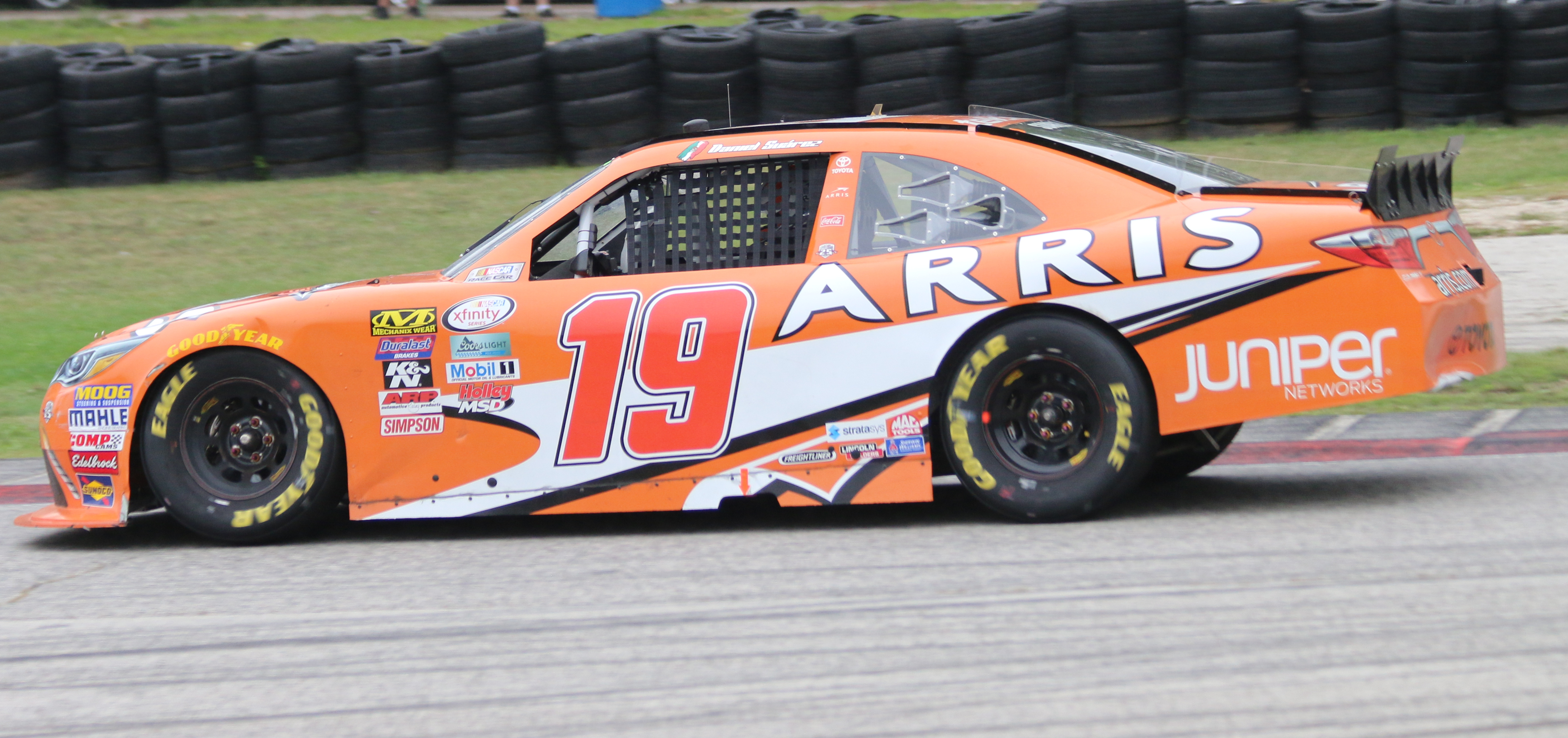
Daniel Suárez, in the No. 19 stock car sponsored by Arris Group, won the 2016 NASCAR Xfinity Series Championship.

On August 19, 2014, Arris announced a sponsorship of NASCAR driver Carl Edwards. Edwards drove the No. 19 Toyota Camry in the Sprint Cup Series for Joe Gibbs Racing, while Daniel Suárez drove the Arris No. 18 in the NASCAR Xfinity Series, from 2015 to 2016 until Edwards left the sport in January 2017. In 2017, Arris and Joe Gibbs Racing renewed a multi-year sponsorship agreement. Arris sponsored Suárez in 22 races during the 2017 season. In 2019, Arris followed Suárez to Stewart–Haas Racing to sponsor the No. 41 Ford Mustang GT.

In January 2019, Arris announced a sponsorship of the Philadelphia Fusion, an e-sports team playing in the Overwatch League. The contract was extended through the 2020 season.
