= Access network =

Part of a telecommunications network

An access network is a section of telecommunications or internet network which connects users or devices to their immediate service provider. When referring specifically to Internet Service Provider (ISP) or other service provider infrastructure, they are commonly referred to as "last mile" networks that connect ISP distribution infrastructure to end users, such as a consumer, business, or organization. Access networks contrast with regional networks, which connect access/local networks to each other and/or to core or backbone networks, which connect major network regions and facilitate high-bandwidth traffic between hubs in an organization, larger network, or the internet.

In some parlances, the access network may be further divided between feeder lines/distribution networks and service drops/edge networks. Edge networks connect end users to centralized aggregation points, while distribution networks take these aggregated signals/infrastructure to central offices, exchanges, or switching equipment. An example of this exists in passive optical networking, where fiber internet is delivered to many homes or businesses by splitting a single fiber connection into multiple daughter connections using passive splitting and signal amplification. Bandwidth to each end user is managed by means such as time-division multiplexing and time-division multiple access for downstream and upstream connections, respectively. In this way, connections to multiple endpoints are aggregated together, and may join some or many other aggregated links destined for ISP infrastructure.

Access networks can also define networking infrastructure within local networks designed to connect devices to more centralized routing infrastructure, such as networks of wired connections or wireless access points providing network connectivity (e.g., wired ethernet or Wi-Fi) to devices.

== History ==
=== Telephone & ISP Networks ===
Access networks began as the series of wires, cables, and equipment lying between a consumer/business telephone termination point (the point at which a telephone connection reaches the customer) and outside plants or a telephone exchange. The connections between outside plants, which can aggregate lines, connect each other, feed into exchanges, and serve as repeaters, fall into this category if they provide these services prior to reaching a telephone exchange or central office. Older access network infrastructure consists largely of coaxial cabling or twisted pairs of copper wires emplaced for telephone communications. Telephone exchanges, formerly staffed by switchboard operators, now contain banks of automated switching equipment which direct a call or connection to the end user.

With the advent of the World Wide Web and the internet, telecommunications providers started offering internet services across existing access network infrastructure. The introduction and rapid increase in popularity of Wireless cellphones caused telecommunications companies to rely more on internet services such as DSL and DOCSIS, over which services such as data plans, VoIP and Internet Protocol television were provided, as revenue from Plain Old Telephone services decreased.

As technology has advanced, there have been multiple attempts to improve the effectiveness and longevity of existing network infrastructure. Switching data transmission from analog to digital allows for faster data and more efficient multiplexing of multiple data streams to increase bandwidth capacity, without requiring upgrading existing transmission infrastructure (though often requiring different termination hardware to send and receive digital vs analog signals). As existing networks age, telecommunications companies are beginning to replace traditional (metal) wired access networks entirely and move towards optical fiber networks, already common for regional and core networks; supporting much higher bandwidths, costing less, and having intrinsically better security. Current conventional (non-satellite) high speed internet infrastructure in the US often consists of hybrid fiber-coaxial networks, though Fiber To The Home/Building (FTTH/FTTB) is often replacing it as bandwidth requirements (particularly upstream) increase. As of June 2023, approximately 55% of US households are within range of a fiber internet access network, and approximately 12.5% of US households have an active fiber optic internet connection.

=== Wireless access networks ===
Due to the specific strengths and drawbacks of wireless networking, access networks are by far the most visible use of wireless networks for Internet Protocol (IP) communication (in contrast to device-to-device (D2D) communication protocols such as Bluetooth, NFC, and Radio Control). However, notable examples of non-access network wireless IP communication do exist, such as microwave backhaul networks or other line-of-sight bridge links.

For the history of wireless networking, see Wireless network § History.

== Types of Access Networks ==
=== Internet Service Provider access networks ===
==== Optical distribution networks ====
A passive optical network (PON) uses single-mode optical fiber to connect outside plants to an ISPs infrastructure. Beamsplitters feed optical distribution frames which terminate individual Fiber to the Building connections. Data is duplexed so that both upstream and downstream signals share the same fiber on separate wavelengths. Faster PON standards generally support a higher split ratio of users per PON, but may also use optical amplifiers where increased signal strength is needed (as passive beamsplitters divide original signal strength amongst the split beams). Current PONs utilize extremely similar topologies, making any PON network upgradable by changing the optical network terminals (ONT) and optical line terminal (OLT) terminals at each end, with minimal change to the entrenched fiber.

Some PON networks use a "home run" topology where roadside cabinets only contain patch panels so that all splitters are located centrally. While a 20% higher capital cost could be expected, home run networks may encourage a more competitive wholesale market since providers' equipment can achieve higher use.

==== Cellular networks ====
The frontend of a cellular network is a type of access network, as it directly connects wireless devices such as mobile phones to an access point, such as a cellular tower. The cell towers direct device outbound traffic to cellular ISP switches for routing to the broader internet, and direct inbound device traffic to the cell tower the device is currently connected to.

=== Local Networks ===
Local Area Networks (LANs) are an internal access network that connect devices to each other or to a Wide Area Network (WAN), such as an internet service provider. Depending on the size of the LAN, some or all of it may be defined as an access network.

In campus or enterprise networking, access networks usually consist of wired ethernet connections or wireless access points that connect to user devices, IoT equipment, and servers. These network endpoints are connected to switches, which handle network traffic to and from access points. Depending on the size of the network, these switches may also serve primary routing functions and as an ISP hookup, or simply bundle traffic sideways to another device or upwards to one or more layers of higher level "aggregation" switches. These switches route data on the network internally or pass data to and from outbound connection(s). The exact point at which the "access network" ends in the local or regional network is not always clear. All of the local network serves to connect the end user to an ISP, "accessing" the wider internet, however large networking deployments also often include dedicated hardware for routing, isolation, and network firewall duties in addition to being a connection and transmission service.

For small networks such as single homes, a wireless router or gateway often provides the sole access network in the form of a Wi-Fi network to connected devices. The router's wireless radios communicate with radios in a device to allow data transmission between the device and the router itself. The router then directs traffic it sees, sending outbound traffic to the ISP for further routing to the internet, and routing incoming or local traffic to appropriate device on the local network. A separate physical switch may be employed to provide wired network connections, such as to IoT devices or devices which do not support wireless network connection. Such switches may be managed or unmanaged, with unmanaged switches being more common for small, inexpensive switches for home use. Most unmanaged switches will send any data they receive to all devices they are connected to, serving as dumb repeaters. Managed switches contain an additional processor capable of additional functions, such as routing, e.g. sending a piece of data only to the device it is addressed to. Enterprise-class switches are almost exclusively of the managed type.

== Access process ==
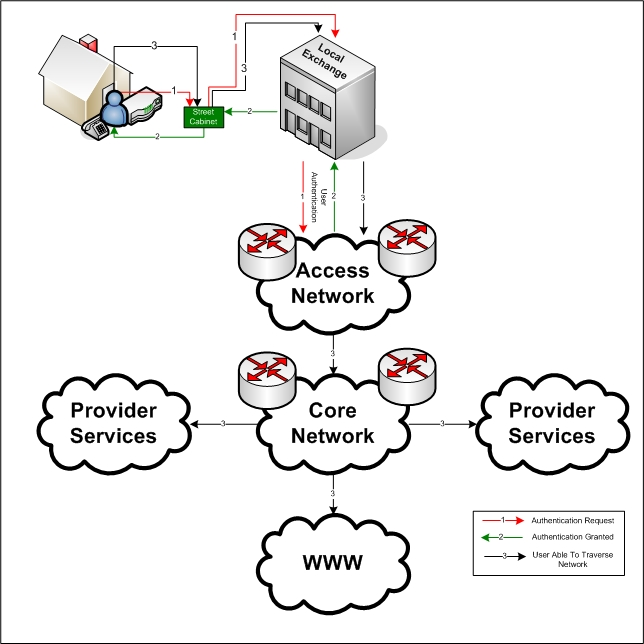
Access Network Authentication High-Level Example

The process of communicating with a network begins with an access attempt, in which one or more users interact with a communications system to enable initiation of user information transfer. An access attempt itself begins with issuance of an access request by an access originator.

An access attempt ends either in successful access or in access failure - an unsuccessful access that results in termination of the attempt in any manner other than initiation of user information transfer between the intended source and destination (sink) within the specified maximum access time.

Access time is the time delay or latency between a requested access attempt and successful access being completed. In a telecommunications system, access time values are measured only on access attempts that result in successful access.

Access failure can be the result of access outage, user blocking, incorrect access, or access denial. Access denial (system blocking) can include:

- Access failure caused by the issuing of a system blocking signal by a communications system that does not have a camp-on busy signal feature.
- Access failure caused by exceeding the maximum access time and nominal system access time fraction during an access attempt.

== Charging for access ==
An access charge is a charge made by a local exchange carrier for use of its local exchange facilities for a purpose such as the origination or termination of network traffic that is carried to or from a distant exchange by an interexchange carrier.

Although some access charges are billed directly to interexchange carriers, a significant percentage of all access charges are paid by the local end users.

== Mobile access networks ==
- GERAN
- UTRAN
- E-UTRAN
- CDMA2000
- GSM
- UMTS
- 1xEVDO
- voLTE
- Wi-Fi in* WiMAX

== See also ==
- Edge device
- Hierarchical internetworking model
- Internet access
- IP connectivity access network
- Local loop
- Passive Optical Network
