= FTTLA =

Fiber telecommunications routing method

FTTLA refers to "Fibre to the Last Active". Classic analogue cable television trunks used several amplifiers at intervals in cascade, each of which degrades the signal. FTTLA replaces the coaxial cable all along the line to the last active component (towards the subscriber) with optical fibre, eliminating all distribution amplifiers. It retains the existing most expensive part of the access network, the coaxial cables for the "last mile" or "last metres" connected with the subscriber.

Fibre to the last amplifier improves scalability (performance and reliability) when new services such as triple play are introduced. From the optical sender to the node, fibre which is split by 4, or by 8 depending on the distance, and on the output power of the optical sender (from 6 to 16 dBm). Intermodulation and carrier-to-noise ratio are improved. Other benefits include lower power consumption.

== See also ==
- FTTx
- FTTH
- FTTB
- Hybrid fibre-coaxial
- Cable Internet access
