= BGP (disambiguation) =

BGP stands for Border Gateway Protocol, an Internet protocol.

BGP may also stand for:

- β-glycerophosphate, a phosphatase inhibitor
- Balanced Growth Path, a steady state solution for some economic growth models
- Brawn GP, a Formula One motor racing team
- Bandwidth guaranteed polling, an Ethernet bandwidth allocation algorithm
- Presidential Guard Battalion (Brazil), honor guard to the President of Brazil
- Blue Gene/P supercomputer
- Basic graph patterns, from computer science's
- Eastern Balochi language, ISO 639-3 language code bgp
