= Interleaved polling with adaptive cycle time =

Dynamic bandwidth allocation algorithm for use in Ethernet passive optical networks

Interleaved polling with adaptive cycle time (IPACT) is an algorithm designed by Glen Kramer, Biswanath Mukherjee and Gerry Pesavento of the Advanced Technology Lab at the University of California, Davis in 2002. IPACT is a dynamic bandwidth allocation algorithm for use in Ethernet passive optical networks (EPONs).

IPACT uses the Gate and Report messages provided by the EPON Multi-Point Control Protocol (MPCP) to allocate bandwidth to Optical Network Units (ONUs). If the optical line terminal grants bandwidth to an ONU and waits until it has received that particular ONU's transmission before granting bandwidth to another ONU, then time equivalent to a whole messaging round-trip is wasted during which the upstream may remain idle. IPACT eliminates this idle time by sending downstream grant messages to succeeding ONUs while receiving transmissions from previously granted ONUs. It accomplishes this by calculating the time at which a transmission grant allocated to a previous ONU ends.
