= Bandwidth guaranteed polling =

Bandwidth Guaranteed Polling (BGP) in computing and telecommunications is a dynamic bandwidth allocation algorithm for Ethernet passive optical networks designed by Maode Ma et al. at the National University of Singapore. This is an instance of an algorithm that allocates bandwidth based on fixed weights.

BGP divides a window of time into fixed-sized slots, a number of which are allocated to each Optical Network Unit (ONU). The number allocated depends upon the ONU customer's service level agreement (SLA). If an ONU does not wish to use its entire allocated time slot, it may inform the OLT about this. The OLT may then decide to reallocate the remaining time slot to another ONU which does not have an SLA.

The BGP algorithm may not be entirely compatible with the MPCP standard. This is because the MPCP does not provide any way for the ONU to inform the OLT about the fraction of the time slot that it wishes to use.
