= Radio frequency over glass =

Fiber network design in telecommunications

In telecommunications, radio frequency over glass (RFoG) is a deep-fiber network design in which the coax portion of the hybrid fiber coax (HFC) network is replaced by a single-fiber passive optical network (PON). Downstream and return-path transmission use different wavelengths to share the same fiber (typically 1550 nm downstream, and 1310 nm or 1590/1610 nm upstream). The return-path wavelength standard is expected to be 1610 nm, but early deployments have used 1590 nm. Using 1590/1610 nm for the return path allows the fiber infrastructure to support both RFoG and a standards-based PON simultaneously, operating with 1490 nm downstream and 1310 nm return-path wavelengths.

== Advantages ==
RFoG delivers the same services as an RF/DOCSIS/HFC network, with the added benefit of improved noise performance and increased usable RF spectrum in both the downstream and return-path directions. Both RFoG and HFC systems can concurrently operate out of the same headend/hub, making RFoG a good solution for node-splitting and capacity increases on an existing network.

RFoG allows service providers to continue to leverage traditional HFC equipment and back-office applications with the new FTTP deployments. Cable operators can continue to rely on the existing provisioning and billing systems, cable modem termination system (CMTS) platforms, headend equipment, set-top boxes, conditional access technology and cable modems while gaining benefits inherent with RFoG and FTTx.

RFoG provides several benefits over traditional network architecture:

- More downstream spectrum; RFoG systems support 1 GHz and beyond, directly correlating to increased video and/or downstream data service support
- More upstream bandwidth; RFoG's improved noise characteristics allow for the use of the full 5–42 MHz return-path spectrum. Additionally, higher-performance RFoG systems not only support DOCSIS 3.0 with bonding, but also enable 64 quadrature amplitude modulation (QAM) upstream transmission in a DOCSIS 3.0 bonded channel, dramatically increasing return-path bandwidth.
- Improved operational expenses; RFoG brings the benefits of a passive fiber topology. Removing active devices in the access network reduces overall power requirements, as well as ongoing maintenance costs that would normally be needed for active elements (such as nodes and amplifiers).

Both cost savings and increased capacity for new services (revenue generating and/or competitive positioning) are driving the acceptance of RFoG as a cost-effective step on the path towards a 100-percent PON-based access network.

== Implementation ==
As with an HFC architecture, video controllers and data-networking services are fed through a CMTS/edge router. These electrical signals are then converted to optical ones, and transported via a 1550 nm wavelength through a wavelength-division multiplexing (WDM) platform and a passive splitter to a fiber-optic micro-node located at the customer premises. If necessary, an optical amplifier can be used to boost the downstream optical signal to cover a greater distance.

The fiber-optic micro-nodes – which are also referred to as RFoG optical-networking units (R-ONUs) – terminate the fiber connection and convert traffic for delivery over the in-home network. Video traffic can be fed over coax to a set-top box, while voice and data traffic can be delivered to an embedded multimedia terminal adapter (eMTA), which connects to analog telephone lines over the subscriber’s internal phone wiring and to PCs via Ethernet or WiFi. The return path for voice, data, and video traffic is over a 1310 or 1590/1610 nm wavelength to a return path receiver, which converts the optical signal to RF and feeds it back into the CMTS and video controller. Although RFoG is providing a capacity increase, one undesired effect of the system is that more than one R-ONU can have the optical return path activated at the same time and on the same wavelength (for instance, one R-ONU falsely triggered by ingress); thus, an optical collision may occur (optical beating).

R-ONUs convert optical signals into electrical ones. This is done in place of the same function traditionally performed back at the higher-level serving area nodes in the HFC network. The RF infrastructure remains in place; the difference is that the fiber termination is moved from a fiber node to the customer's premises. The R-ONU can be located in any type of premises: a home, a business, a multi-tenant dwelling (MTU/MDU), or apartments in an MTU.

When the network is upgraded, the RFoG elements can remain in place while the provider rolls out the necessary components (OLTs and ONTs) for a full PON implementation.

== Standards ==
The Society of Cable and Telecommunications Engineers (SCTE) has approved SCTE 174 2010, the standards for RFoG. The standard has been approved by the American National Standard Institute (ANSI).

== Status ==
Cable service providers (also known as MSOs) have generally responded favorably to the technology and the benefits it brings to their networks. Many have tried the technology, and some have begun to deploy RFoG. Following positive experience with smaller deployments in newly built housing and with the finalization of the standard, it is expected to become more widely adopted.
