= Hybrid fiber-coaxial =

Telecommunications industry term

Hybrid fiber–coaxial (HFC) is a broadband telecommunications network that combines optical fiber and coaxial cable. It has been commonly employed globally by cable television operators since the early 1990s.

In a hybrid fiber–coaxial cable system, television channels are sent from the cable system's distribution facility, the headend, to local communities through optical fiber subscriber lines. At the local community, a fiber media converter translates the signal from a light beam to radio frequency current (RF), and sends it over coaxial cable lines for distribution to subscriber residences. The fiber optic trunk lines provide enough bandwidth to allow additional bandwidth-intensive services such as cable internet access through DOCSIS. Bandwidth is shared among users of an HFC. Encryption is used to prevent eavesdropping. Customers are grouped into service groups, which are groups of customers that share bandwidth among each other since they use the same RF channels to communicate with the company.

== Description ==
A common HFC architecture

The fiber optic network extends from the cable operators' master headend, sometimes to regional headends, and out to a neighborhood's hubsite, and finally to an optical to coaxial cable node which typically serves 25 to 2000 homes. A master headend will usually have satellite dishes for reception of distant video signals as well as IP aggregation routers. Some master headends also house telephony equipment (such as automatic telephone exchanges) for providing telecommunications services to the community. In an HFC network telephony is provided using PacketCable.

A regional or area headend/hub will receive the video signal from the master headend and add to it the public, educational, and government access (PEG) cable TV channels as required by local franchising authorities or insert targeted advertising that would appeal to a local area, along with internet from a CMTS (an Integrated CMTS, which includes all parts required for operation), or a CCAP which provides both internet and video.

Separate Edge QAMs can be used to provide QAM modulated video suitable for transmission in a coaxial cable network, from digital video sources. Edge QAMs can also be connected to a CMTS to provide internet data instead of video, in a modular CMTS architecture. CCAPs aim to replace the conventional, integrated CMTS which only provides data and Edge QAMs used for video which are separate pieces of equipment.

Video can be encoded according to standards such as NTSC, MPEG-2, DVB-C or the QAM standard and data according to DOCSIS, analog video can be scrambled, signals can be modulated by analog or digital video modulators including QAM modulators or edge QAMs for video and/or data depending on whether a modular CMTS is used, at the CMTS for data only, or at the CCAP for video and data, and upconverted onto RF carriers in this equipment.

The various services from CMTSs, CCAPs, Edge QAMs and QAM modulators are combined onto a single RF electrical signal using headend RF management modules such as splitters and combiners and the resulting signals are inserted into a broadband optical transmitter which in practice is a transmitter module in an "optics platform" or headend platform such as an Arris CH3000, Scientific Atlanta Prisma, or a Cisco Prisma II.

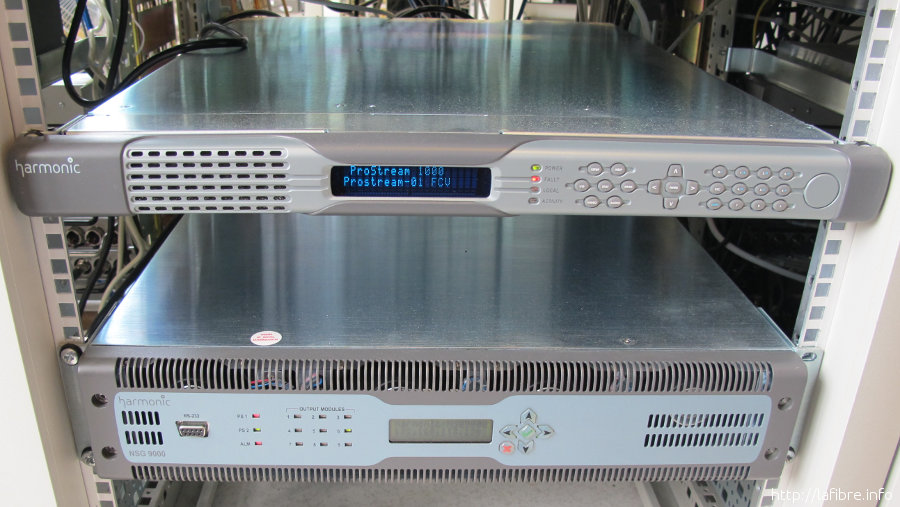
Top: video encoder, decoder and multiplexer, Bottom: Edge QAM turns video in IP packets over Ethernet from the device above and other devices, to RF QAM signals ready to be transmitted

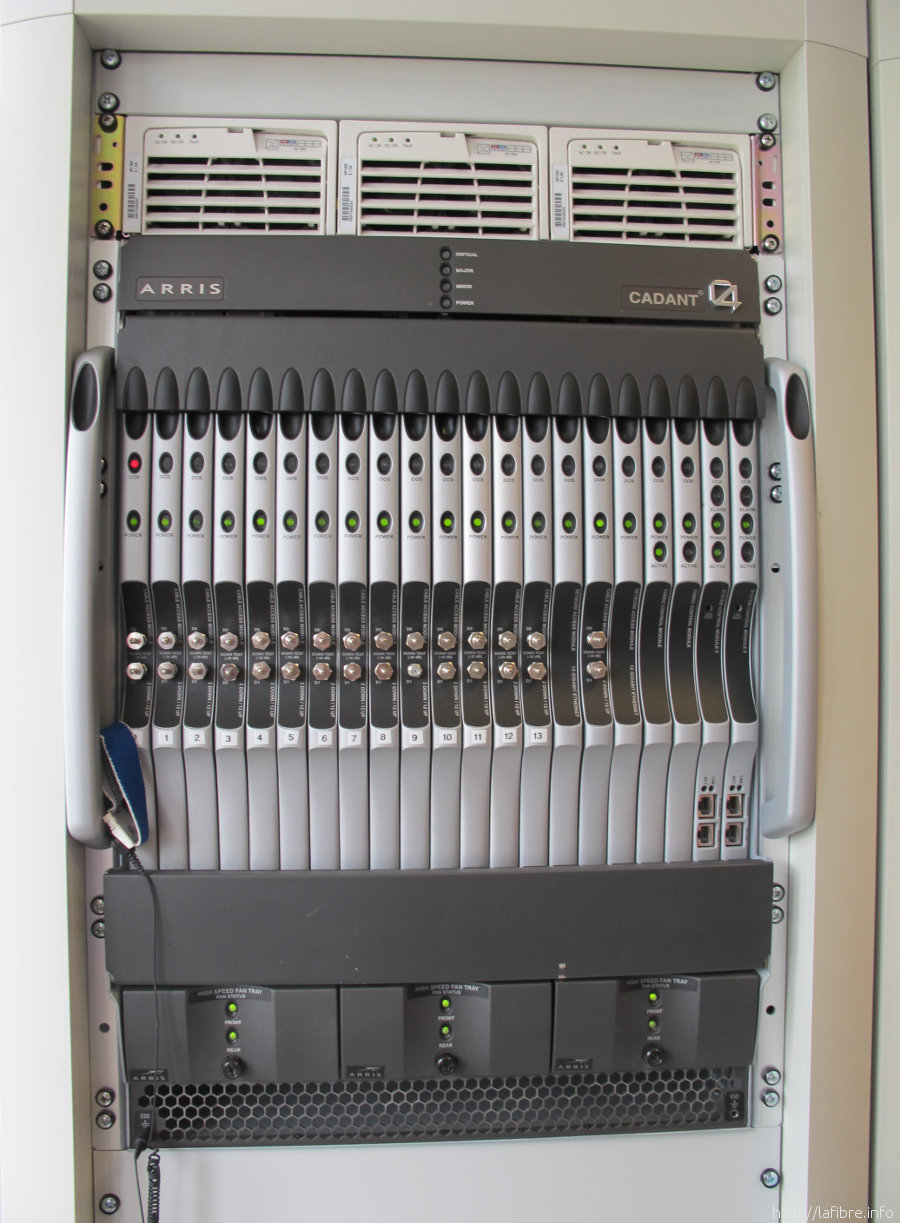
CMTS provides internet on an HFC network and has RF connections on the rear

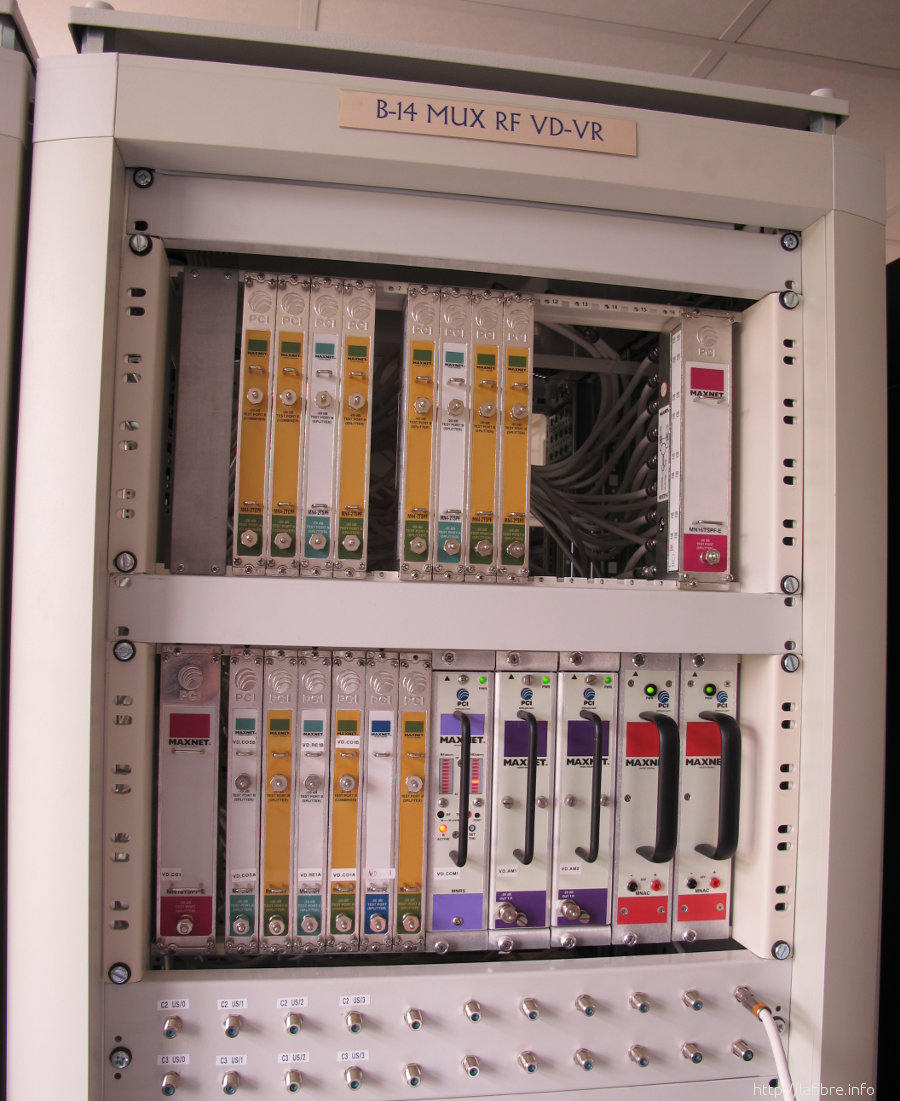
MAXNET RF management: combiner and splitter modules for RF signals in coaxial cables, just before they are sent to the transmitter

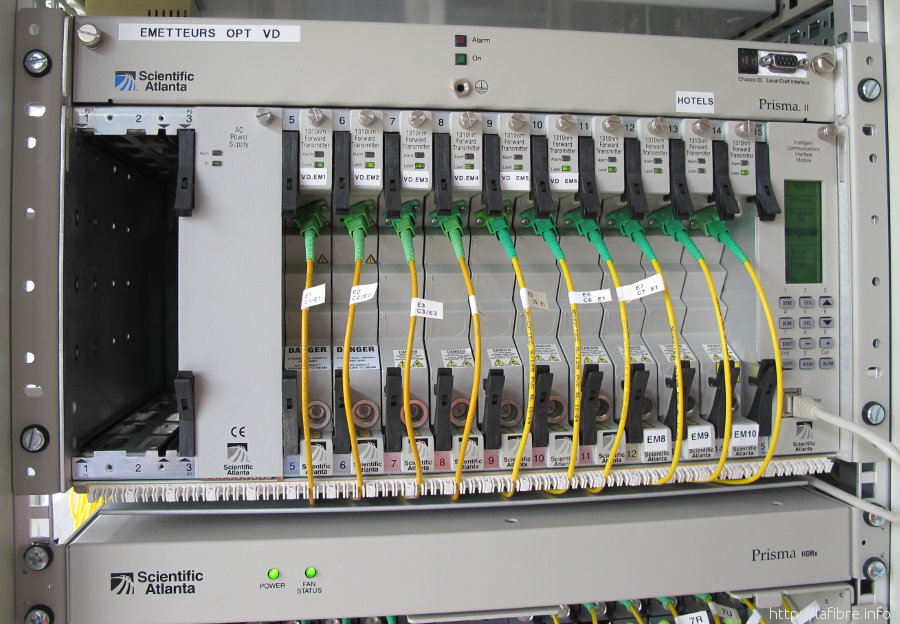
Scientific Atlanta Prisma II chassis with transmitter modules, converts RF signals in coaxial cables into optical signals in fiber optics and amplifies them

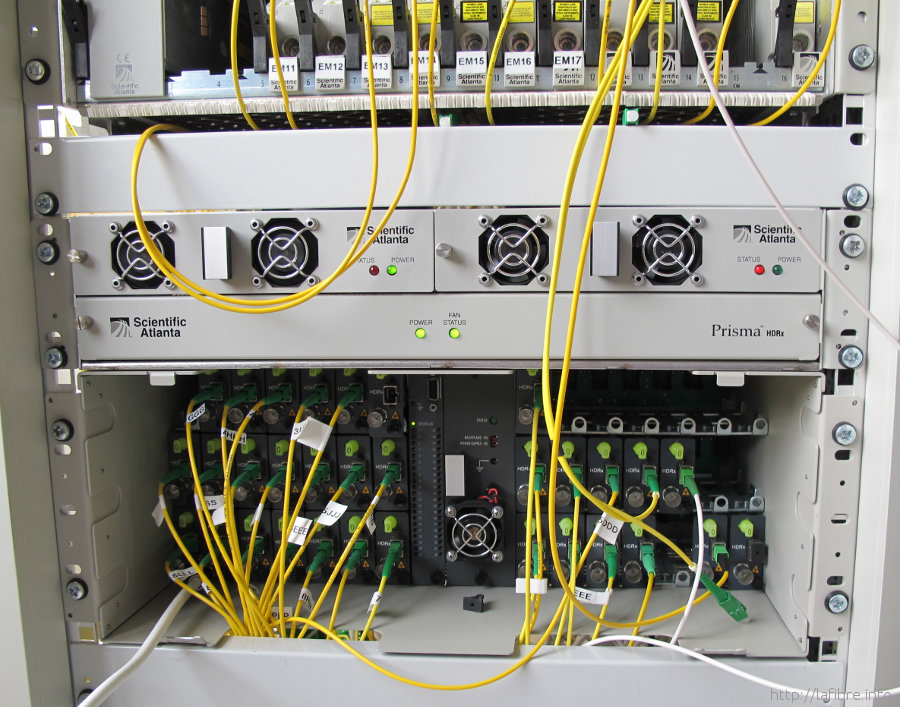
Scientific Atlanta HDRx chassis with many receiver modules for receiving data from customers, which is their internet upload bandwidth in this case in an HFC coaxial network, it converts optical signals in fiber optics into RF signals in coaxial cables.

These platforms host several transmitters and receivers the latter of which can be used for cable internet, and can also host Erbium-Doped Fiber Amplifiers (EDFAs) to extend the reach of the optical signals in fiber optics. Each transmitter and receiver can service one optical node. It is common to see more reception cables than transmission cables in the CCAP/CMTS and associated optical receivers. The reception cables carry fewer channels due to lower bandwidth, and having more cables for the upstream than the downstream reduces noise caused by noise funneling. Thus, it is common for a single downstream cable to be shared among several optical nodes via splitters, and for each upstream cable to be shared among fewer or even a single optical node, in a ratio of 4 to 12 upstream channels for every downstream channel. Having more upstream cables than downstream cables alleviates noise funneling at the receiver, the CMTS, which is not a problem for the downstream at the cable modem because it is on the receiving end of a broadcast point to multipoint architecture.

This optical transmitter converts the RF electrical signal to a downstream optically modulated signal that is sent to the nodes. Fiber optic cables connect the headend or hub to the optical nodes in a point-to-point or star topology, or in some cases, in a protected ring topology. Each node can be connected via its own dedicated fiber, so fiber optic cables laid outdoors in the outside plant can have several dozen to several hundred or even thousands of fibers, an extreme example being 6912 fibers.

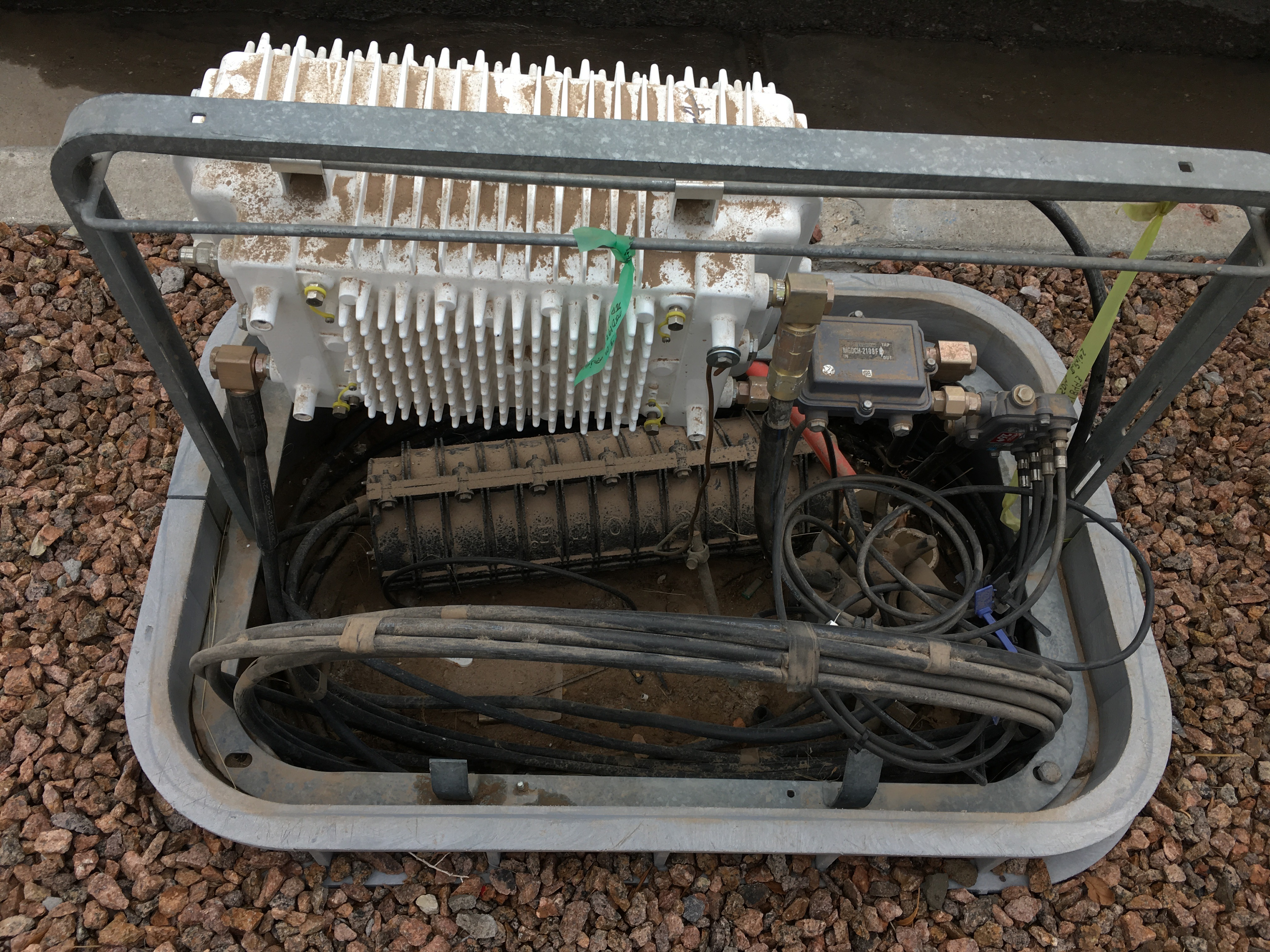
An optical node with a fiber splice case (black)

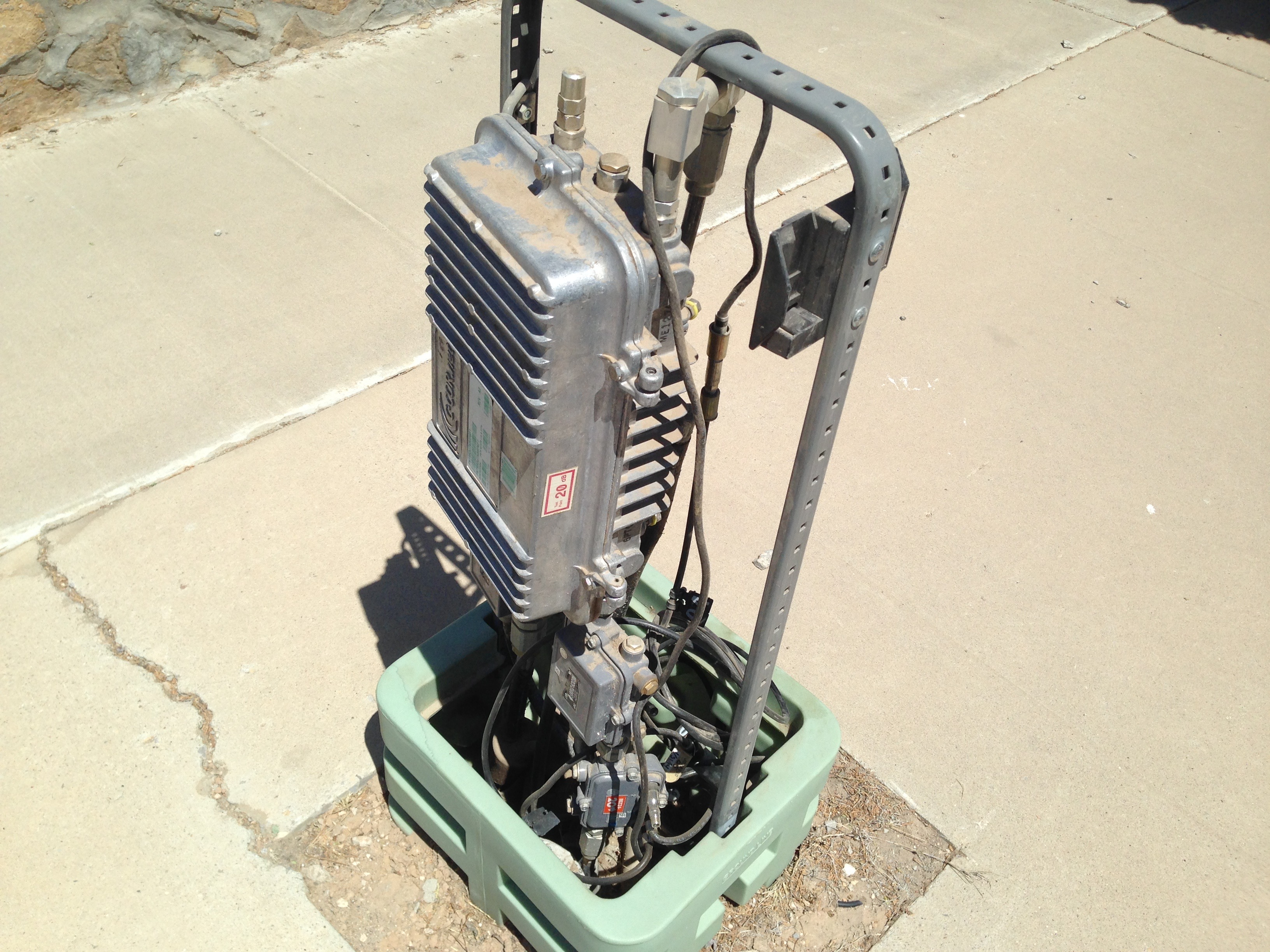
A trunk amplifier

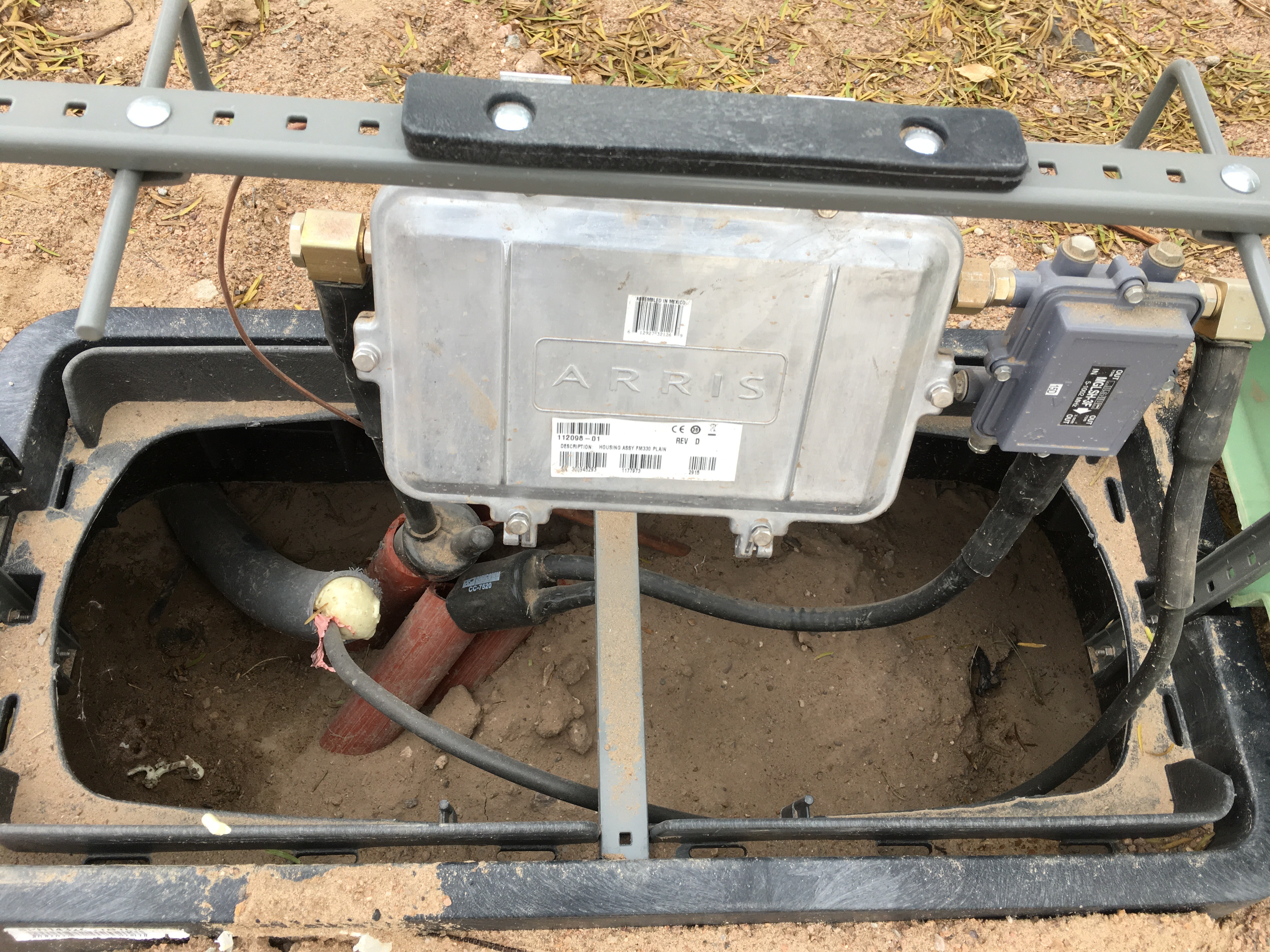
A distribution amplifier (line extender)

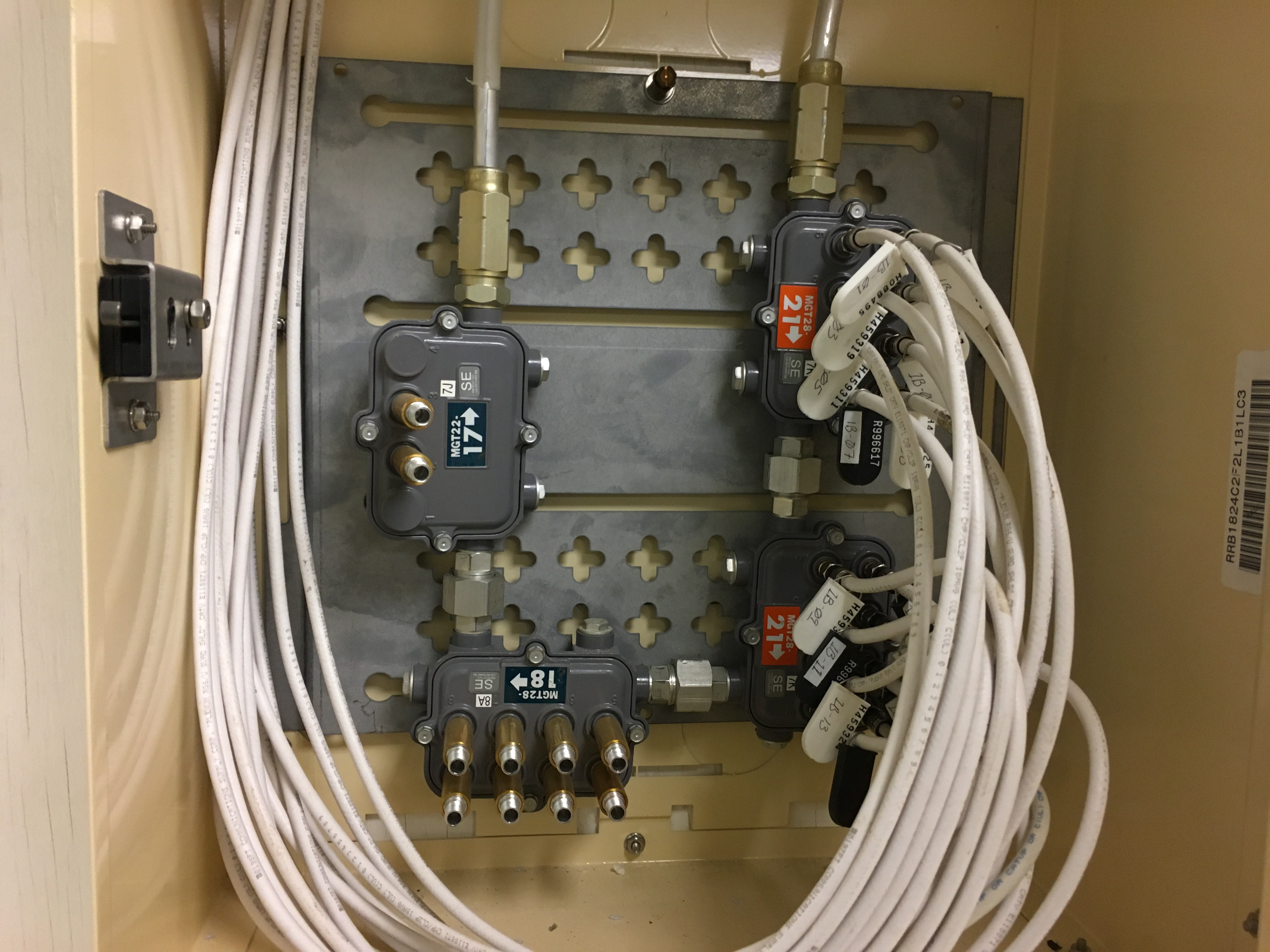
A series of taps (servicing multiple rooms in a hotel) from a distribution line or "trunk" with terminators on unused ports

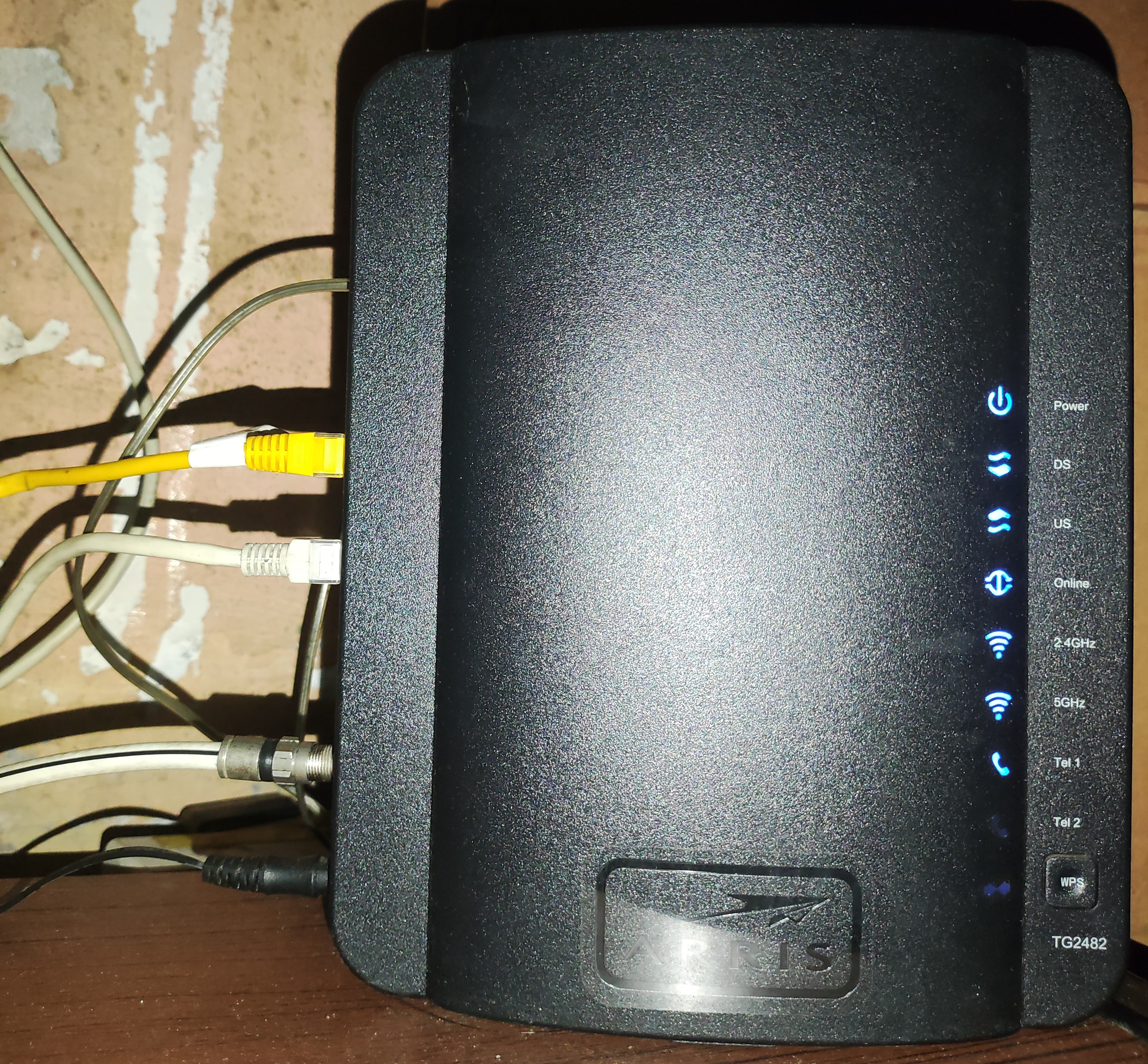
Cable modem, also called a router or gateway with coaxial cable connection to an HFC network on the bottom left using a threaded F connector

=== Fiber optic nodes ===
A fiber optic node has a broadband optical receiver, which converts the downstream optically modulated signal coming from the headend or hub to an electrical signal going to the customers. As of 2015, the downstream signal is a RF modulated signal that typically begins at 50 MHz and ranges from 550 to 1000 MHz on the upper end. The fiber optic node also contains a reverse- or return-path transmitter that sends communication from customers back to the headend. In North America, this reverse signal is a modulated RF ranging from 5–42 MHz while in other parts of the world, the range is 5–65 MHz. This electrical signal is then outputted through coaxial cable to form a coaxial trunk.

The optical portion of the network provides a large amount of flexibility. If there are not many fiber-optic cables to the node, wavelength division multiplexing can be used to combine multiple optical signals onto the same fiber. Optical filters are used to combine and split optical wavelengths onto the single fiber. For example, the downstream signal could be on a wavelength at 1550 nm and the return signal could be on a wavelength at 1310 nm.

=== Final connection to customers ===
The coaxial trunk portion of the network connects 25–2000 homes (500 is typical) in a tree-and-branch configuration off of the node.

Trunk coaxial cables are connected to the optical node and form a coaxial backbone to which smaller distribution cables connect. RF amplifiers called trunk amplifiers are used at intervals in the trunk to overcome cable attenuation and passive losses of the electrical signals caused by splitting or "tapping" the coaxial cable. Trunk cables also carry AC power which is added to the cable line at usually either 60 or 90 V by a power supply (with a lead acid backup battery inside) and a power inserter. The power is added to the cable line so that optical nodes, trunk and distribution amplifiers do not need an individual, external power source. The power supply might have a power meter next to it depending on local power company regulations.

From the trunk cables, smaller distribution cables are connected to a port of one of the trunk amplifiers called a bridger to carry the RF signal and the AC power down individual streets. Usually trunk amplifiers have two output ports: one for the trunk, and another as a bridger. Distribution amplifiers (also called system amplifiers) can be connected from a bridger port to connect several distribution cables to the trunk if more capacity is needed as they have multiple output ports. Alternatively, line extenders, which are smaller distribution amplifiers with only one output port, can be connected to the distribution cable coming off the bridger port in the trunk and used to boost the signals in the distribution cables to keep the power of the television signal at a level that the TV can accept. The distribution line is then "tapped" into and used to connect the individual drops to customer homes.

These RF taps pass the RF signal and block the AC power unless there are telephony devices that need the back-up power reliability provided by the coax power system. The tap terminates into a small coaxial drop using a standard screw type connector known as an F connector.

The drop is then connected to the house where a ground block protects the system from stray voltages. Depending on the design of the network, the signal can then be passed through a splitter to multiple TVs or to multiple set top boxes (cable boxes) which may then be connected to a TV. If too many splitters are used to connect multiple TVs, the signal levels will decrease, and picture quality on analog channels will decrease. The signal in TVs past those splitters will lose quality and require the use of a "drop" or "house" amplifier to restore the signal.

=== Evolution of HFC networks ===
Historically the trend among cable operators has been to reduce the amount of coaxial cable used in their networks to improve signal quality, which initially led to the adoption of HFC. HFC replaced coaxial cable networks which had coaxial trunk cables originating at the headend of the network, and HFC replaced part of these trunk cables with fiber optic cables and optical nodes. In these coaxial networks, trunk amplifiers were placed along the trunk cables to maintain adequate signal levels in the trunks, distribution feeder cables could be used to distribute signals from the trunks into individual streets, directional couplers were used to improve signal quality, trunk amplifiers could be equipped with automatic level control or automatic gain control, hybrid amplifiers, which have a hybrid integrated circuit could also be used, and separate bridgers were used to connect the trunk to distribution feeders.

In 1953, C-COR was the first to introduce cable powering which transmits power through coaxial cables for powering cable amplifiers. In 1965, it introduced the use of integrated circuits in amplifiers used on utility poles and in 1969 was the first to use heat fins on amplifiers. The first amplifiers in outdoor housings with hinges and seals, for installation between utility poles hanging from messenger wires, were offered in 1965. In around 1973, hubs began to be used in cable networks to increase signal quality as a result of network expansion, and cable operators made efforts to reduce the number of amplifiers in cascade on coaxial parts of the network from around 20 to 5. Supertrunks made of coaxial cable with FM modulated video signals, fiber optics or microwave links were used to connect headends to hubs. Fiber optics were first used as a supertrunk in 1976. FM video could be also carried in fiber optics, and fiber optics eventually replaced coaxial cables in supertrunks. Bandwidth in cable networks increased from 216 MHz to 300 MHz in the 1970s, to 400 MHz in the 1980s, to 550 MHz, 600 MHz and 750 MHz in the 1990s, and to 870 MHz in the year 2000.

To cope with needs for increased digital bandwidth such as for DOCSIS internet, cable operators have implemented expansions in the RF spectrum in HFC networks beyond 1 GHz to 1.2 GHz, have transitioned to only handling IP traffic in the network thus eliminating dedicated video RF channels, used digital transport adapters (DTAs) for transmitting normally analog signals, or used Switched Digital Video (SDV) which allows the number of television channels in coaxial cables to be reduced without reducing the number of channels that are offered.

Towards the end of the 1990s GaAs (Gallium Arsenide) transistors were introduced in HFC nodes and amplifiers, replacing silicon transistors which allowed an expansion of the spectrum used in HFC from 870 MHz to 1 GHz by 2006. GaN transistors, introduced in 2008 and adopted in the 2010s allowed for another expansion to 1.2 GHz, or for expansion from 550 MHz to 750 MHz in older networks to 1 GHz without changing the spacing between amplifiers.

Remote PHY is an evolution of the HFC network that aims to reduce the use of coaxial cable in the network and improve signal quality. In a conventional HFC network, headend equipment such as CMTSs and CCAPs are connected to the HFC network using RF interfaces which physically are coaxial cable connections and optical signals in fiber optic cables in the network are analog. In Remote PHY, equipment such as CMTSs or CCAPs are connected directly to the HFC network using fiber optics carrying digital signals, eliminating the RF interface and coaxial cables at the CMTS/CCAP and RF modulation at the headend, and replacing analog signals in fiber optic cables in the network, with digital signals such as 10 Gigabit Ethernet signals, which eliminate the need for calibrating the HFC network bi-annually, extends the reach of the network, reduces the cost of equipment and maintenance, and improves signal quality and allows for modulation such as 4096 QAM instead of 1024 QAM, allowing more information to be transmitted at a time, per bit. This requires more sophisticated optical nodes which can also convert signals from digital to analog performing modulation, unlike conventional optical nodes which only need to convert signals from optical to electrical. These devices are known as Remote PHY devices (RPDs) or Remote MACPHY devices (RMDs) replacing conventional optical nodes. RPDs come in shelf variants which can be installed in apartment buildings (MDUs, multi dwelling units) and can also be installed in optical nodes or at a small hub which distributes signals similarly to a conventional HFC network. Alternatively Remote PHY can allow for a CMTS/CCAP to be located in a remote data center away from customers.

Remote MACPHY, besides achieving the same purpose as Remote PHY, also moves all DOCSIS protocol functionality from the CCAP to the optical node or the outside plant, which can reduce latency when compared to Remote PHY. Remote CMTS/Remote CCAP builds upon this by moving all remaining CMTS/CCAP functionality to the outside plant. Distributed Access Architecture (DAA) covers Remote PHY and Remote MACPHY and has as the goal, moving functions closer to end customers, allowing for easier capacity expansions as centralized facilities for equipment are downsized or potentially eliminated, and newer DOCSIS versions beyond DOCSIS 3.1 with higher speeds. Remote PHY allows for some reuse of existing equipment such as CMTSs/CCAPs by replacing components in the CMTS/CCAP.

Virtual CCAPs (vCCAPs) or virtual CMTSs (vCMTSs) are implemented on commercial off the shelf x86-based servers with specialized software and connect to the outside plant via fiber optics or can have special PCIe coaxial cards for conventional RF connections to a transmitter, are often implemented alongside DAA and can be used to increase service capacity without purchasing new CMTS/CCAP chassis, or add features to the CMTS/CCAP more quickly.

Improving internet speeds for customers can be carried out by reducing the number of service groups with subscribers from 500 subscribers to no more than 128, in what is known as a n+0 architecture, with a single node and no amplifiers. HFC networks operating at 1.8 GHz to 3 GHz have been explored with GaN transistors. Changes in the frequency range used for upstream signals have been proposed: a mid split which uses frequencies from 5 to 85 MHz for the upstream, a high split which uses a range from 5 to 205 MHz, and an ultra high split with several options that allow for ranges of up to 5 to 684 MHz. Full duplex (FDX) DOCSIS allows upstream and downstream signals to simultaneously occupy a single frequency range without time division multiplexing. Cable operators have been gradually shifting to FTTP networks using PON (Passive Optical Networks).

== Transport over HFC network ==
By using frequency-division multiplexing, a HFC network may carry a variety of services, including analog TV, digital TV (SDTV or HDTV), video on demand, telephony, and internet traffic. Services on these systems are carried on RF signals in the 5 MHz to 1000 MHz frequency band.

The HFC network is typically operated bi-directionally, meaning that signals are carried in both directions on the same network from the headend/hub office to the home, and from the home to the headend/hub office. The forward-path or downstream signals carry information from the headend/hub office to the home, such as video content, voice and Internet traffic. The very first HFC networks, and very old unupgraded HFC networks, are only one-way systems. Equipment for one-way systems may use POTS or radio networks to communicate to the headend. HFC makes two-way communication over a cable network practical because it reduces the number of amplifiers in these networks.

The return-path or upstream signals carry information from the home to the headend/hub office, such as control signals to order a movie or internet upstream traffic. The forward-path and the return-path are carried over the same coaxial cable in both directions between the optical node and the home.

To prevent interference of signals, the frequency band is divided into two sections. In countries that have traditionally used NTSC System M, the sections are 52–1000 MHz for forward-path signals, and 5–42 MHz for return-path signals. Other countries use different band sizes, but are similar in that there is much more bandwidth for downstream communication than for upstream communication.

Traditionally, since video content was sent only to the home, the HFC network was structured to be asymmetrical: one direction has much more data-carrying capacity than the other direction. The return path was originally used for only some control signals to order movies, etc., which required very little bandwidth. As additional services have been added to the HFC network, such as Internet access and telephony, the return path is being utilised more.

=== Multiple-system operators ===
Multi-system operators (MSOs) developed methods of sending the various services over RF signals on the fiber optic and coaxial copper cables. The original method to transport video over the HFC network and, still the most widely used method, is by modulation of standard analog TV channels which is similar to the method used for transmission of over-the-air broadcast.

One analog TV channel occupies a 6-MHz-wide frequency band in NTSC-based systems, or an 8-MHz-wide frequency band in PAL or SECAM-based systems. Each channel is centred on a specific frequency carrier so that there is no interference with adjacent or harmonic channels. To be able to view a digitally modulated channel, home, or customer-premises equipment (CPE), e.g. digital televisions, computers, or set-top boxes, are required to convert the RF signals to signals that are compatible with display devices such as analog televisions or computer monitors. The US Federal Communications Commission (FCC) has ruled that consumers can obtain a cable card from their local MSO to authorize viewing digital channels.

By using digital video compression techniques, multiple standard and high-definition TV channels can be carried on one 6 or 8 MHz frequency carrier, thus increasing the channel carrying capacity of the HFC network by 10 times or more versus an all-analog network.

== Comparison to competing network technologies ==
Digital subscriber line (DSL) is a technology used by traditional telephone companies to deliver advanced services (high-speed data and sometimes video) over twisted pair copper telephone wires. It typically has lower data carrying capacity than HFC networks and data speeds can be range-limited by line lengths and quality.

Satellite television competes very well with HFC networks in delivering broadcast video services. Interactive satellite systems are less competitive in urban environments because of their large round-trip delay times, but are attractive in rural areas and other environments with insufficient or no deployed terrestrial infrastructure.

Analogous to HFC, fiber in the loop (FITL) technology is used by telephone local exchange carriers to provide advanced services to telephone customers over the plain old telephone service (POTS) local loop.

In the 2000s, telecom companies started significant deployments of fiber to the x (FTTX) such as passive optical network solutions to deliver video, data and voice to compete with cable operators. These can be costly to deploy but they can provide large bandwidth capacity especially for data services.

== Gallery ==
Inside a headend:

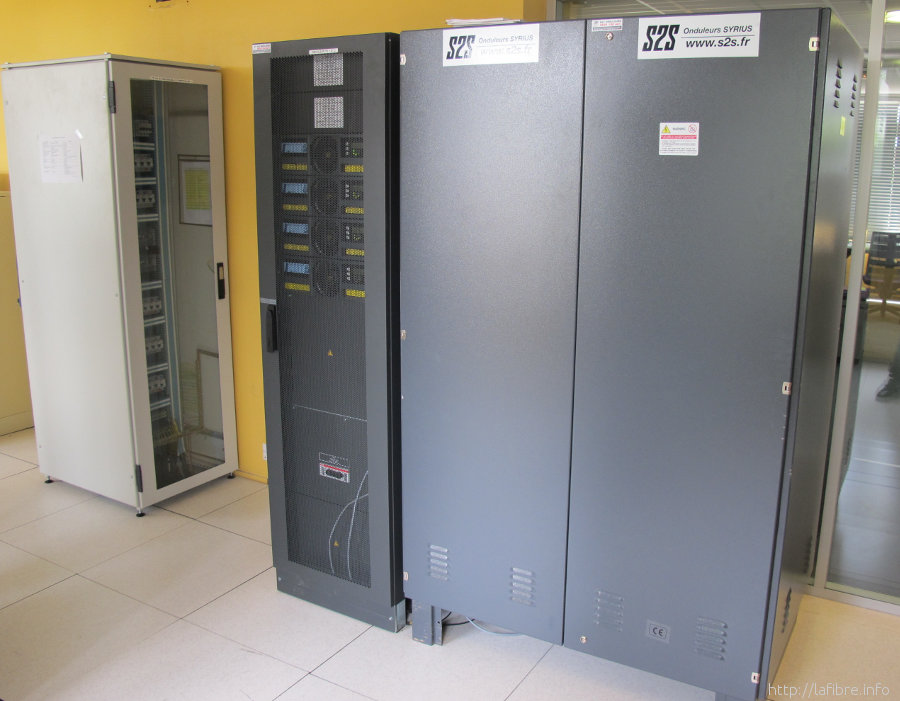
-48V supply systems and UPS system: many telecommunications devices at ISPs and headends are powered by -48V DC power.

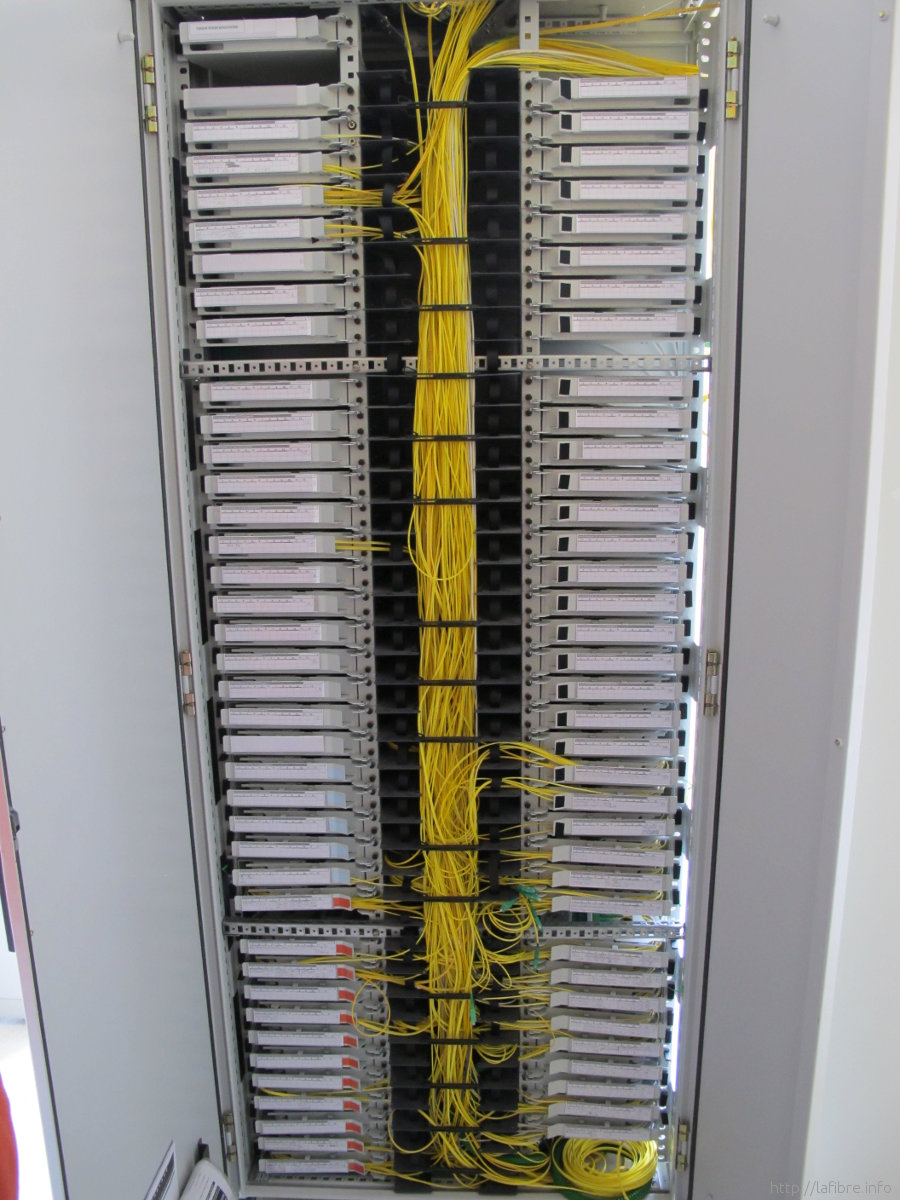
Fiber entrance cabinet with numerous trays on the sides, the cabinet connects the headend to fiber optic cables connected to optical nodes outdoors, equipment and cables outdoors are called the outside plant

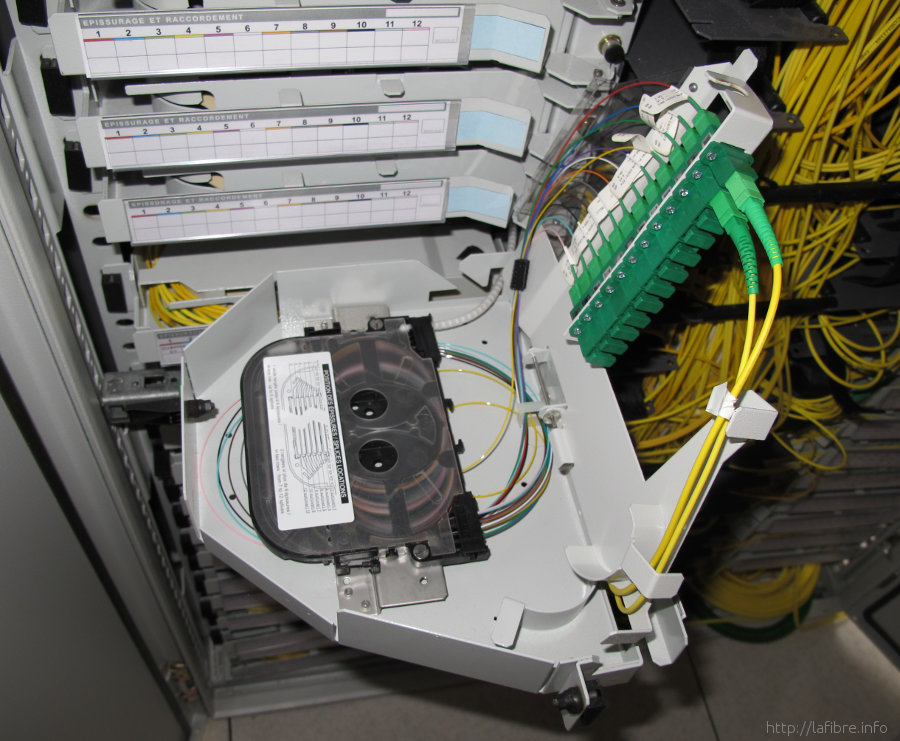
Inside one of the trays with fiber splices inside the tray and connectors folded out

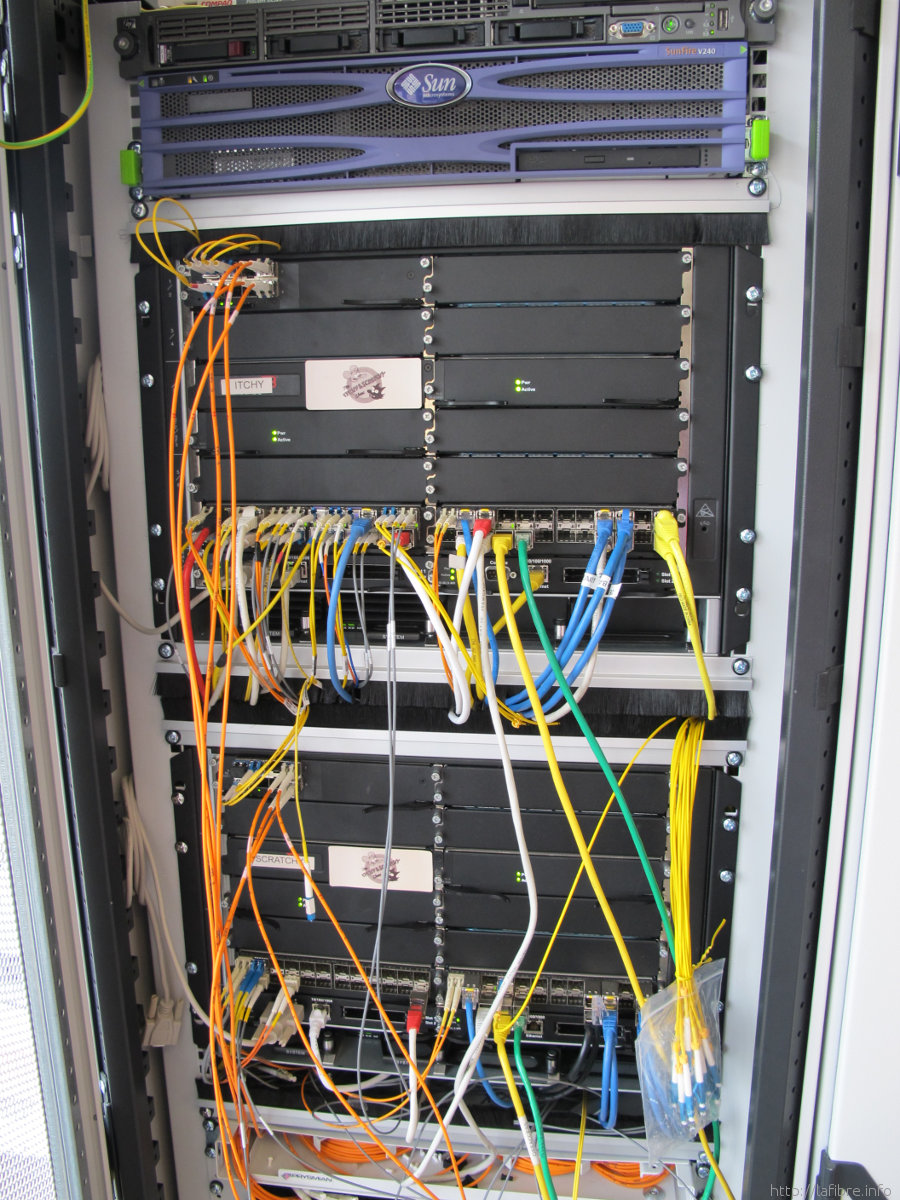
Core router for internet access to the CMTS

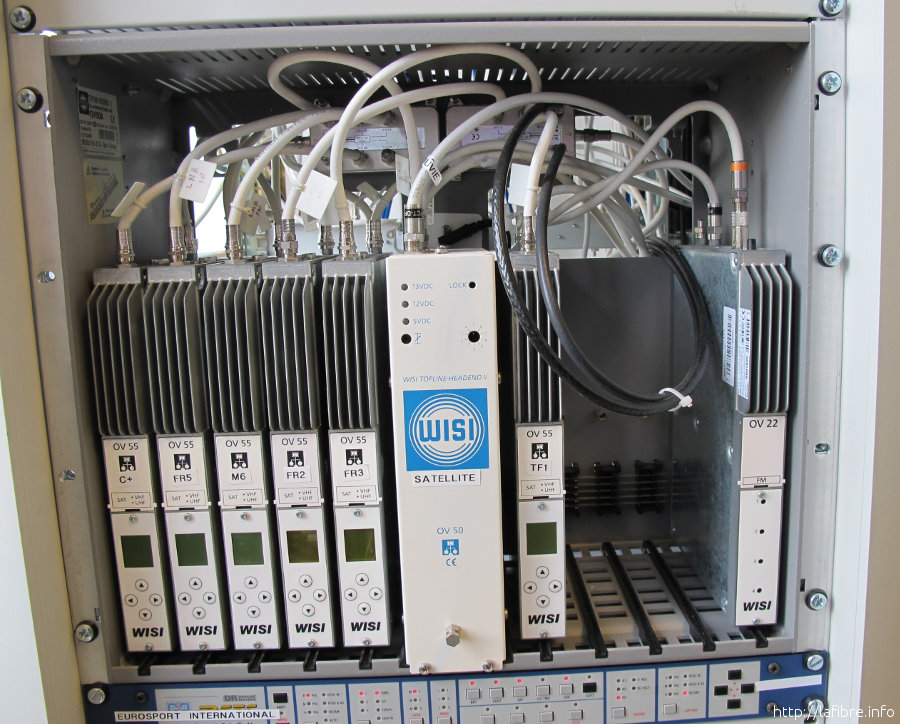
Satellite TV signal amplification to prepare it for reception

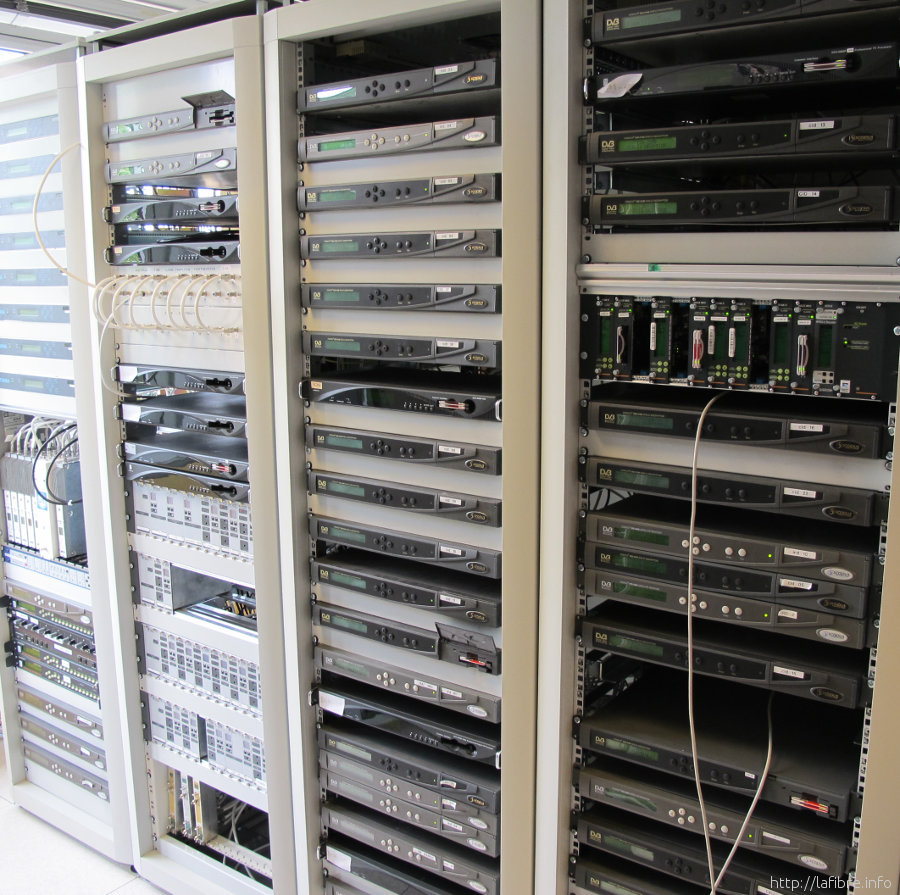
Satellite TV reception equipment, on the right and center there are DVB Asynchronous serial interface multiplexers to package several channels in one DVB Asynchronous serial interface stream to prepare it for distribution via the HFC network, just before the edge QAMs

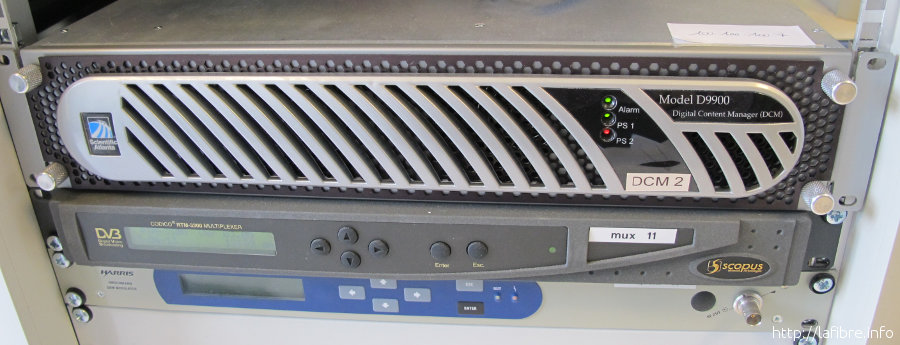
TV encryption and DRM equipment (DCM, Digital Content Manager) can be used for IPTV transmission to users

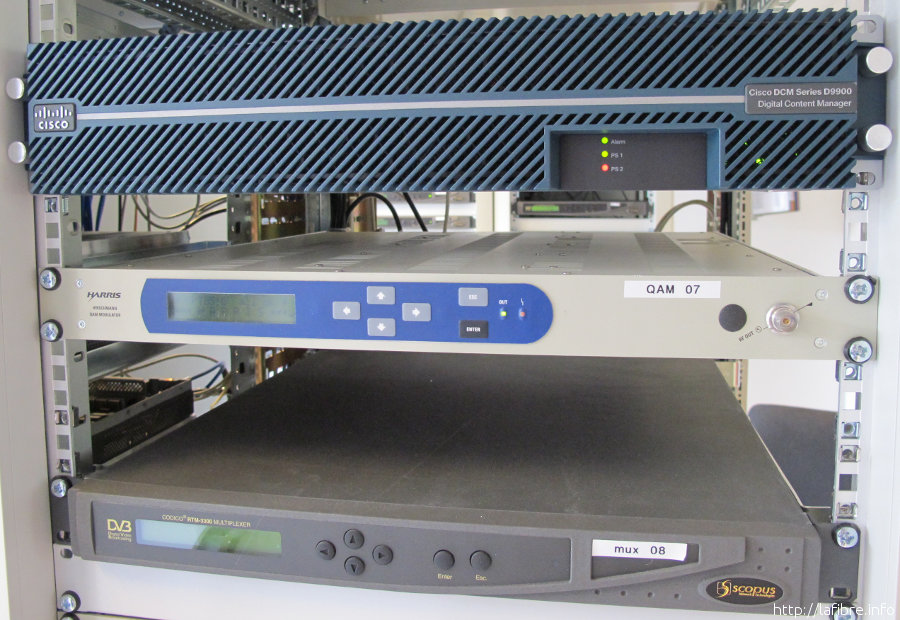
Another Digital Content Manager (Top), Edge QAM (middle)

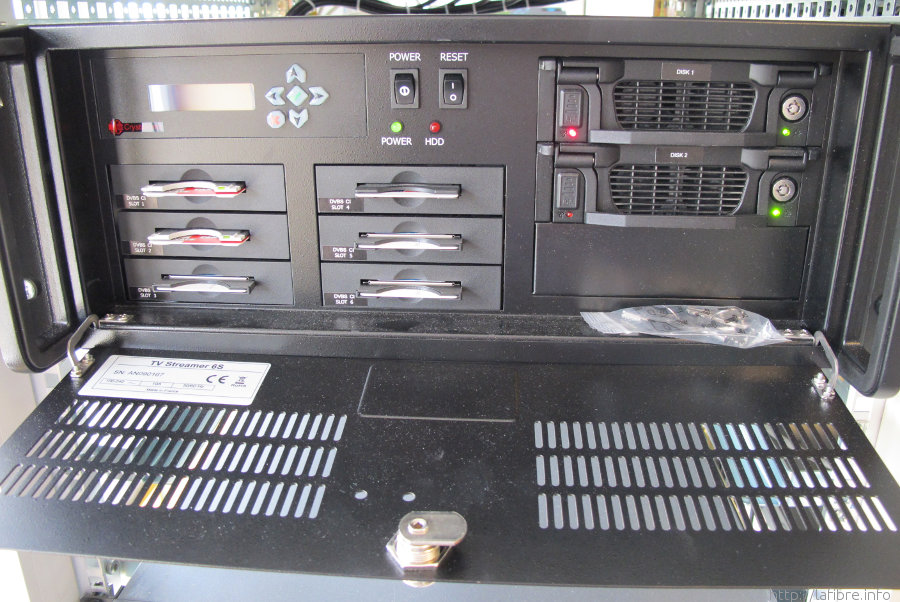
Satellite TV reception device (ip streamer) with Conditional Access Cards inserted to receive encrypted satellite TV which is then turned into MPEG IP streams via Ethernet

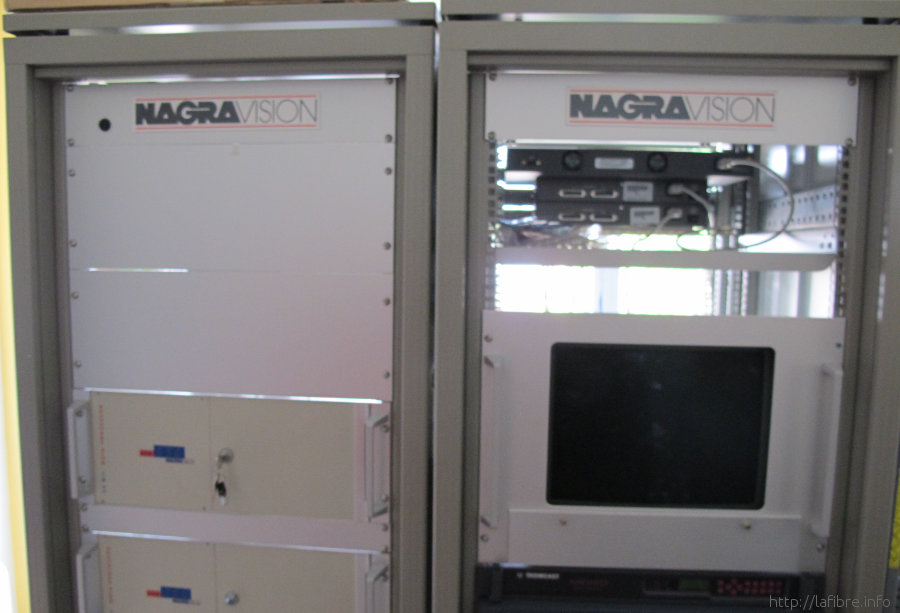
Unused analog DRM, Conditional access system for cable TV(Nagravision)

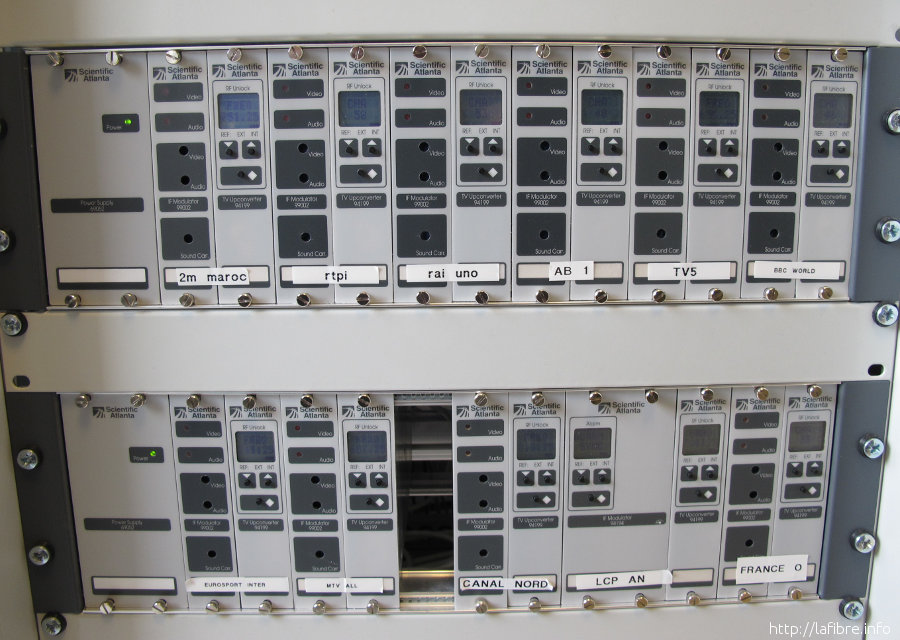
Analog TV modulators and up-converters for insertion into the HFC network

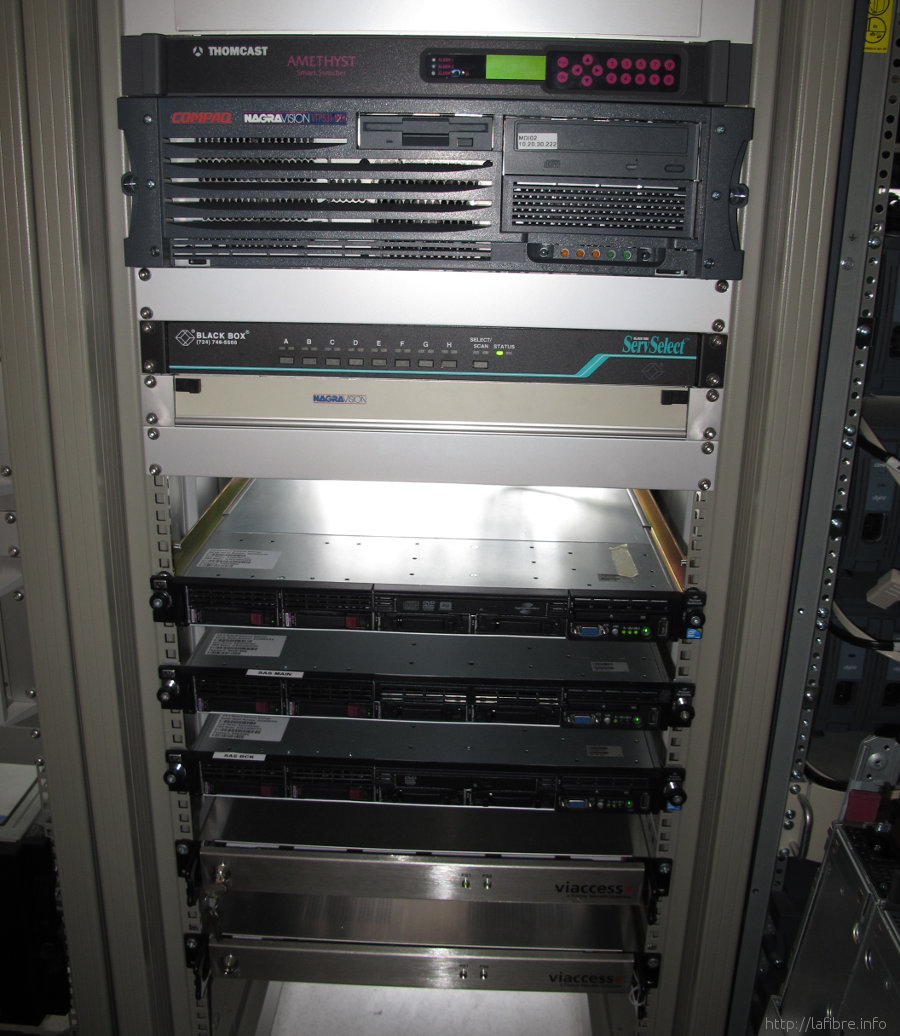
In the bottom half of the image: Viaccess encryption and conditional access system with 3 black rackmount servers and 2 silver devices which are card readers

== See also ==
- Access network
- Backbone network
- Cable modem
- Cable modem termination system (CMTS)
- DOCSIS
- FTTLA
- Multimedia over Coax Alliance
- National Cable & Telecommunications Association (NCTA – US)
- Network service provider
- Radio frequency over glass (RFoG)
- Quadrature amplitude modulation
- MPEG-2
- Multichannel multipoint distribution service
- Society of Cable Television Engineers (SCTE – US)
