= Data plan =

Subscription plan for internet data and connectivity

A data plan is a subscription plan from a cellular or other mobile service provider to provide internet data and connectivity.

== Formatting ==
Data plans are usually created by a contract between the telecommunications carrier and the user of their service. This contract outlines a maximum amount of usable data, usually highlighted in either megabytes or gigabytes, allotted per month for the user. In most cases companies will allow a user to surpass the amount of data allowed in the contract, however, will have to pay a per-gigabyte fee, ranging anywhere from five to fifteen U.S. dollars.

=== Popularization of unlimited plans ===
Unlimited data plans have seen a large increase in usage by consumers since their initial introduction by U.S. network T-Mobile. These plans, instead of setting an overall maximum for the user, have an amount set-up that, when surpassed, will slow the speed of the network for that user. Unlimited plans typically cost significantly more than the traditional shared data plans, which is a major reason that carriers have set large boundaries and fees. The limits imposed on unlimited plans are designed to fight against attempts to misuse the network, such as a DDoS attack, but are more commonly reasoned as a method to increase the number of people that can use one tower simultaneously.

=== Data speed changes ===
When a network is near reaching peak capacity data speeds may be slowed down by carriers as part of most major telecom contracts. This, as stated previously, allows for more people to be utilizing one tower, reducing needed capital for the company. Since speed changes are allowed at the company's will, the user has no official guarantee of speed on most major networks.

=== Costs brought upon by additional data ===
In many cases both the user and carrier have to incur additional costs when a user utilizes more of a given data package, which has helped in the proliferation of data caps and other forms of shared data plans. Most of the charges that the carrier has to incur for additional data usage is partially or fully given to the user of the network.

==== Users ====
Users are required to pay flat-rate additional fees that occur when they go above the amount of data given to them in their contract, utility, or prepaid plan. The cost per gigabyte of this fee is usually higher than what the contract itself offers, which discourages users from over-utilizing data and incurring a charge for the carrier. Certain contracts, which do not offer paying additional fees for an increase in data, may result in a shutdown of service, or in extremely rare cases, termination of the service as a whole.

==== Carriers ====
Carriers incur costs for additional data usage, as it limits the number of customers, and associated contracts, that they can handle on one network. Creating more cell phone towers in a given area would be costly, and largely useless until particular spikes in traffic. When the peak usable amount of one tower is reached, it may cause negative public relations towards the reliability of the corporation as a whole.
