= Fiber-optic filter =

Optical fiber instrument

Fiber-optic filter is an optical fiber instrument used for wavelength selection, which can select desired wavelengths to pass and reject the others. It is Widely used in DWDM systems dynamic wavelength selection, DWDM signal separation, optical performance monitoring, field tunable optical noise filtering and optical amplifier noise suppression, etc. Optical multiplexers (couplers) makes different wavelength coupling into an optical fiber and different wavelength carries different information. At the receiving end, if you want to separate desired wavelengths from optical fiber, it is necessary to use optical filter.

== Characteristics ==
- Many wavelengths selection, channel spacing can be very small, low manufacturing cost, small polarization dependent loss, small design, fast installation, stable and reliable performance, different connector can be provided according to customer demand.

== Application ==
- FTTX optical fiber communication systems, WDM system, LAN, CATV, fiber optic sensing, fiber amplifiers, fiber laser, measuring instruments, medical equipment.

== Principle ==
Grating spectrometer principle

- The above drawing is a schematic diagram of grating separating the mixed lightwave. Mixed wavelengths（λ1、λ2、λ3）from optical fiber, After the collimating lens (L1) post-directed to the grating，the optical signals of different wavelengths due to the different diffraction angle, is focused to different position through the lens (L2), then the optical signal is coupled into different optical fiber for output. This is the principle of the grating spectrometer.
- Prism spectroscopic principle as shown in drawings, Its working principle is: Contains more than one optical signal wavelength of light, As a result of Lens collimator, separated the light through the prism, After the separation of light through another lens is focused and coupled into the corresponding optical fiber in the spread. As well known, the propagation velocity of the different wavelengths in the same kind of material is not the same, That refractive index n (n = c / V) with wavelength dependent, If choose dn / dλ material for prism, you can get large angular dispersion of skills and high color resolution power.
- In addition, When the width of the prism surface is appropriately increased, and as far as possible to reduce the diameter of the collimating lens, You can get the best performance of the spectral effects, The lens, in the above system can be used to replace the self-focusing lens, its effect is completely the same.

Interference film filter principle

- The interference film structure as shown in the drawings. The superposition of alternating dielectric film by both refractive index (n) of varying sizes. Its thickness is 1/4 wavelength, By different choices of the dielectric film constituting longwave pass, shortwave pass, and band pass filter. A high refractive index layer of the light reflected from its phase does not shift, The reflected light of the low refractive index layer whose phase is shifted by 180 degrees, Reflected several times through the interface of each film and the linear superposition of the transmitted light, when the optical wavelength of the optical path difference is equal to, or the same phase, multiple transmitted light will interfere with phase strengthened, to form a strong transmitted lightwaveinverting lightwave offset each other. Can be obtained a good filtering performance filters by appropriate design of the dielectric multilayer film systems.

== Optical fiber ==
- Optical fiber connector
- Fiber-optic communication
- Optical fiber cable
- Optical interconnect
- Fiber optic patch cord
- Telecommunications Industry Association
- Fiber
- Splitter ADSL
