= Dynamic bandwidth allocation =

Telecommunications resource sharing technique

Dynamic bandwidth allocation is a technique by which traffic bandwidth in a shared telecommunications medium can be allocated on demand and fairly between different users of that bandwidth. This is a form of bandwidth management, where the sharing of a link adapts in some way to the instantaneous traffic demands of the nodes connected to the link.

Dynamic bandwidth allocation takes advantage of several attributes of shared networks:

1. all users are typically not connected to the network at one time
2. even when connected, users are not transmitting data (or voice or video) at all times
3. most traffic occurs in bursts—there are gaps between packets of information that can be filled with other user traffic

Different network protocols implement dynamic bandwidth allocation in different ways. These methods are typically defined in standards developed by standards bodies such as the ITU, IEEE, FSAN, or IETF. One example is defined in the ITU G.983 specification for passive optical network (PON).

== See also ==
- Statistical multiplexing
- Channel access method
- Dynamic channel allocation
- Reservation ALOHA (R-ALOHA)
