= Telephone jack and plug =

Connectors for wiring of telephone equipment

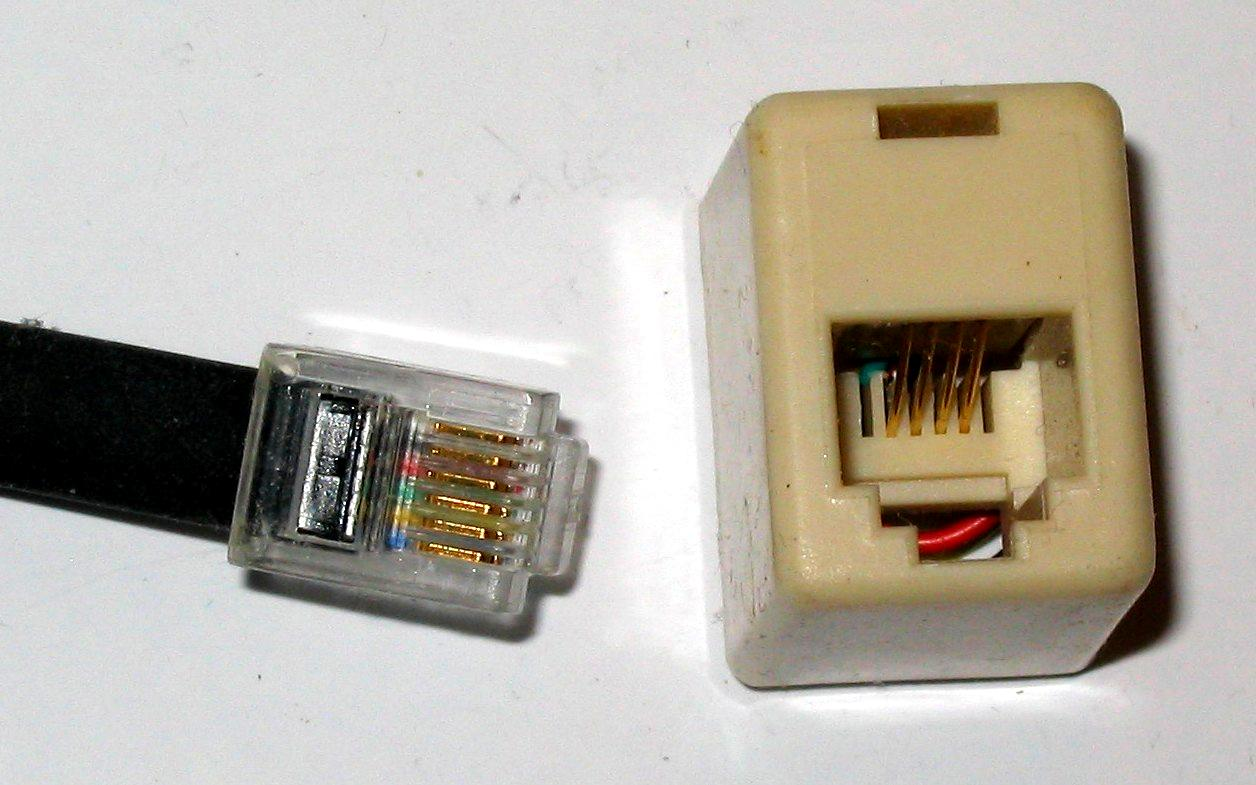
Modular connector 6P6C plug (left) and 6P4C jack (right)

A telephone jack and a telephone plug are electrical connectors for connecting a telephone set or other telecommunications apparatus to the telephone wiring inside a building, establishing a connection to a telephone network. The plug is inserted into its counterpart, the jack, which is commonly affixed to a wall or baseboard. The standards for telephone jacks and plugs vary from country to country, though the 6P2C style modular plug has become by far the most common type.

A connection standard, such as RJ11, specifies not only the physical aspects of an electrical connector, but also the signal definitions for each contact, and the pinout of the device, i.e. the assignment or function of each contact. Modular connectors are specified for the registered jack (RJ) series of connectors, as well as for Ethernet and other connectors, such as 4P4C (4 position, 4 contacts) modular connectors, the de facto standard on handset cords, often improperly referred to as RJ connectors.

== History ==
Historically, telephones were typically owned by the telephone company, and were usually permanently wired to the telephone line. For some applications it was necessary or convenient to provide portable telephone sets that could be moved to a different location within the customer's premises. For this purpose telephone companies developed jacks and plugs in various designs with various numbers of contacts. Before c. 1930, concentric connectors with three contacts were usually sufficient, but the upgrade of telephone sets to anti-sidetone circuitry in the 1930s required at least four conductors between a desk set and the subscriber set that contained the telephone hybrid and a ringer. For this purpose, Bell System engineers developed a cube-shaped four-prong plug (type no. 283) with uneven prong spacings to avoid improper insertion into the jack.

The cubic design was changed to a round version (No. 505A) in the mid 1960s. The four-prong jack and plug combination was the standard line connection for all portable telephone sets until the conversion to modular jacks in the 1970s, typified by the Registered Jack standards promulgated in U.S. federal law.

Many countries initially used different specifications for connectors, and some national connector types remain in service, but few are used for new installations for which modular connector types are prescribed.

Bell System Type 404A jack and type 283B plug (c. 1960)

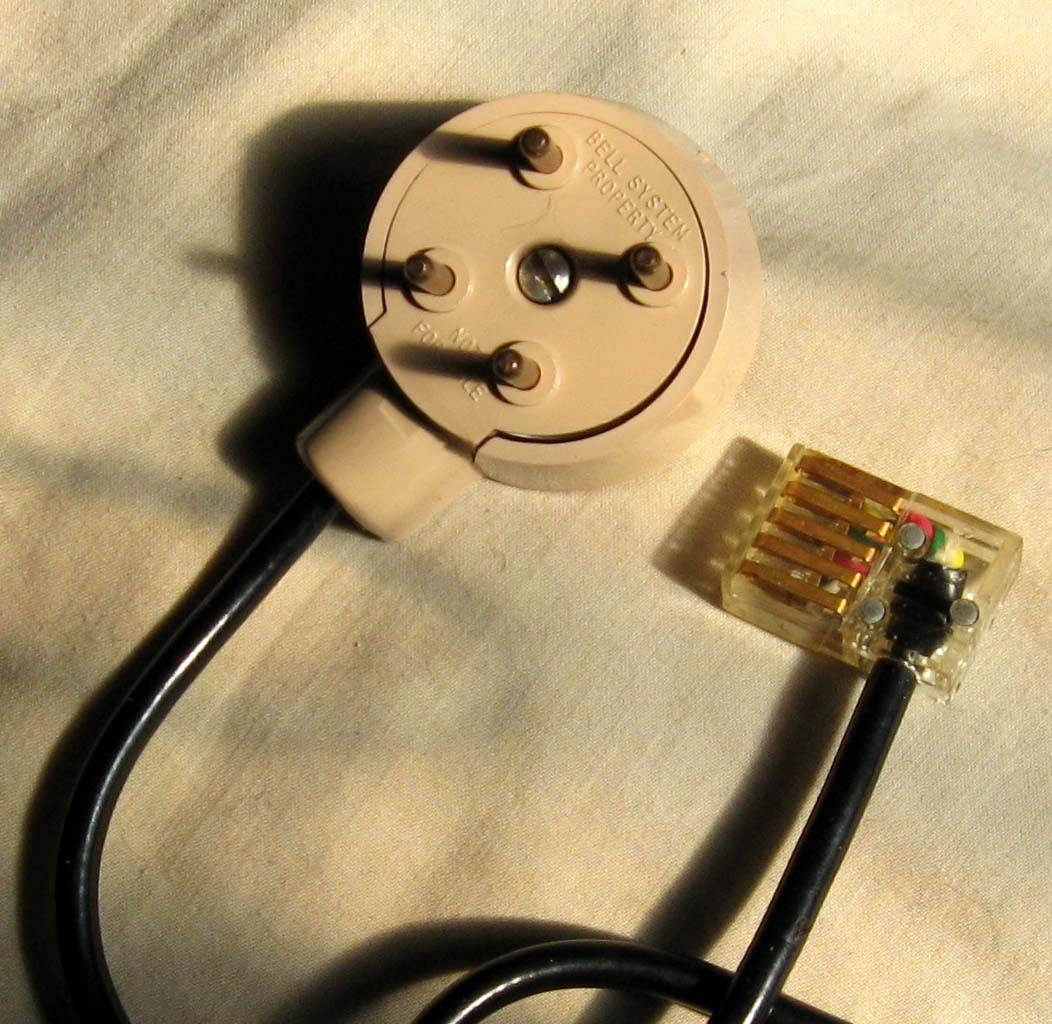
Trimline telephone line cord with a Type 505A wall plug and modular set plug (mid-1960s)

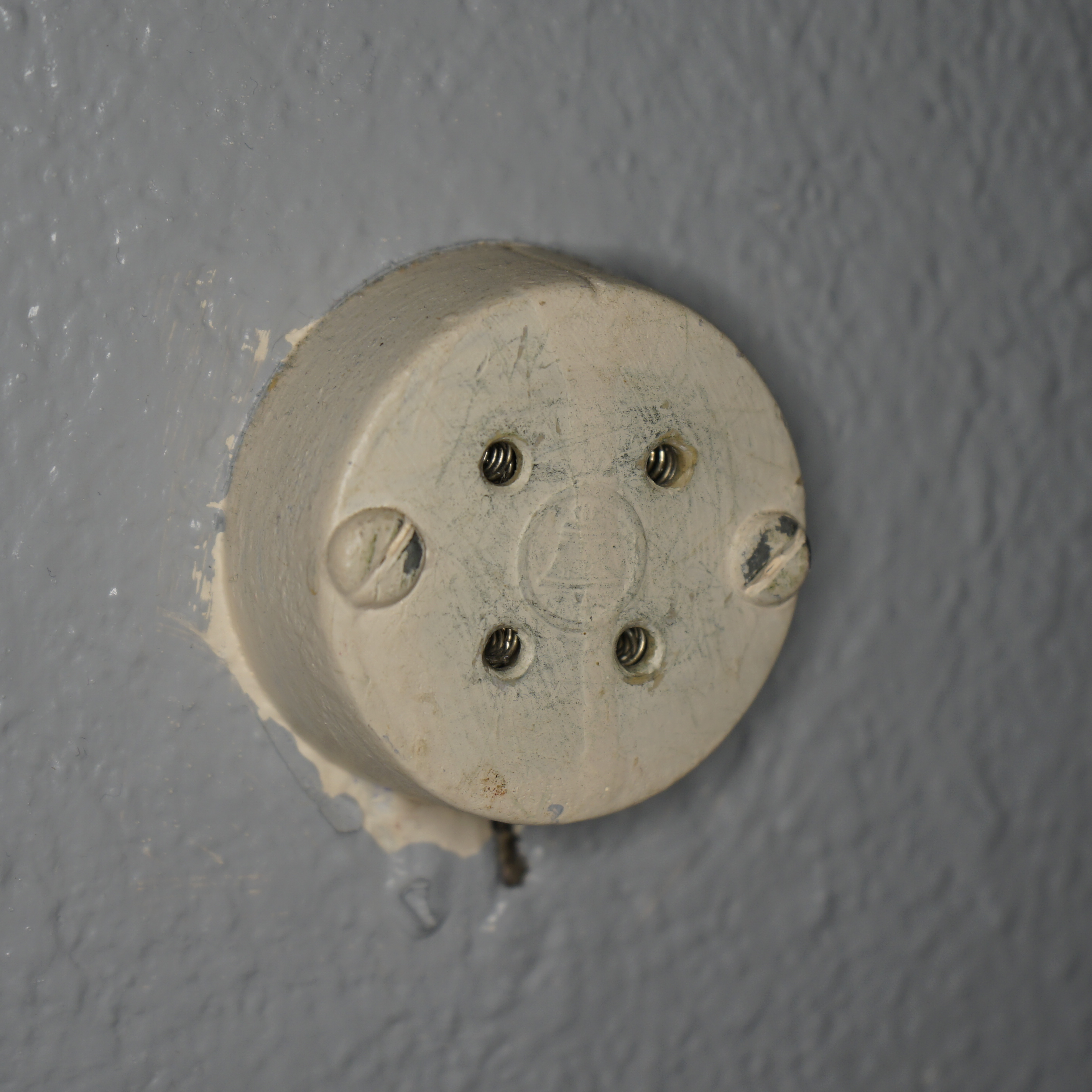
Type 505A wall jack (1968)

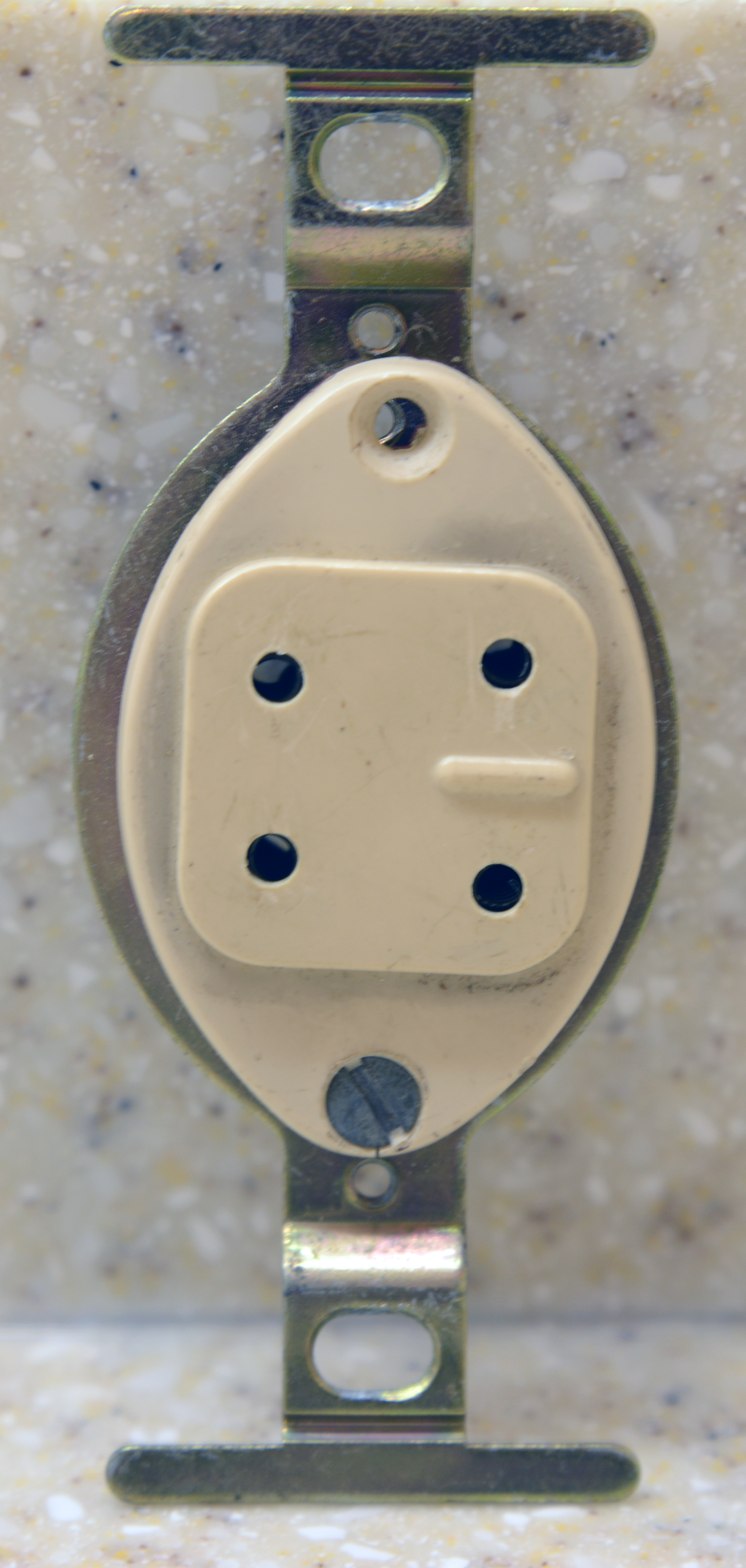
The front of a US four-pronged telephone jack (1964)

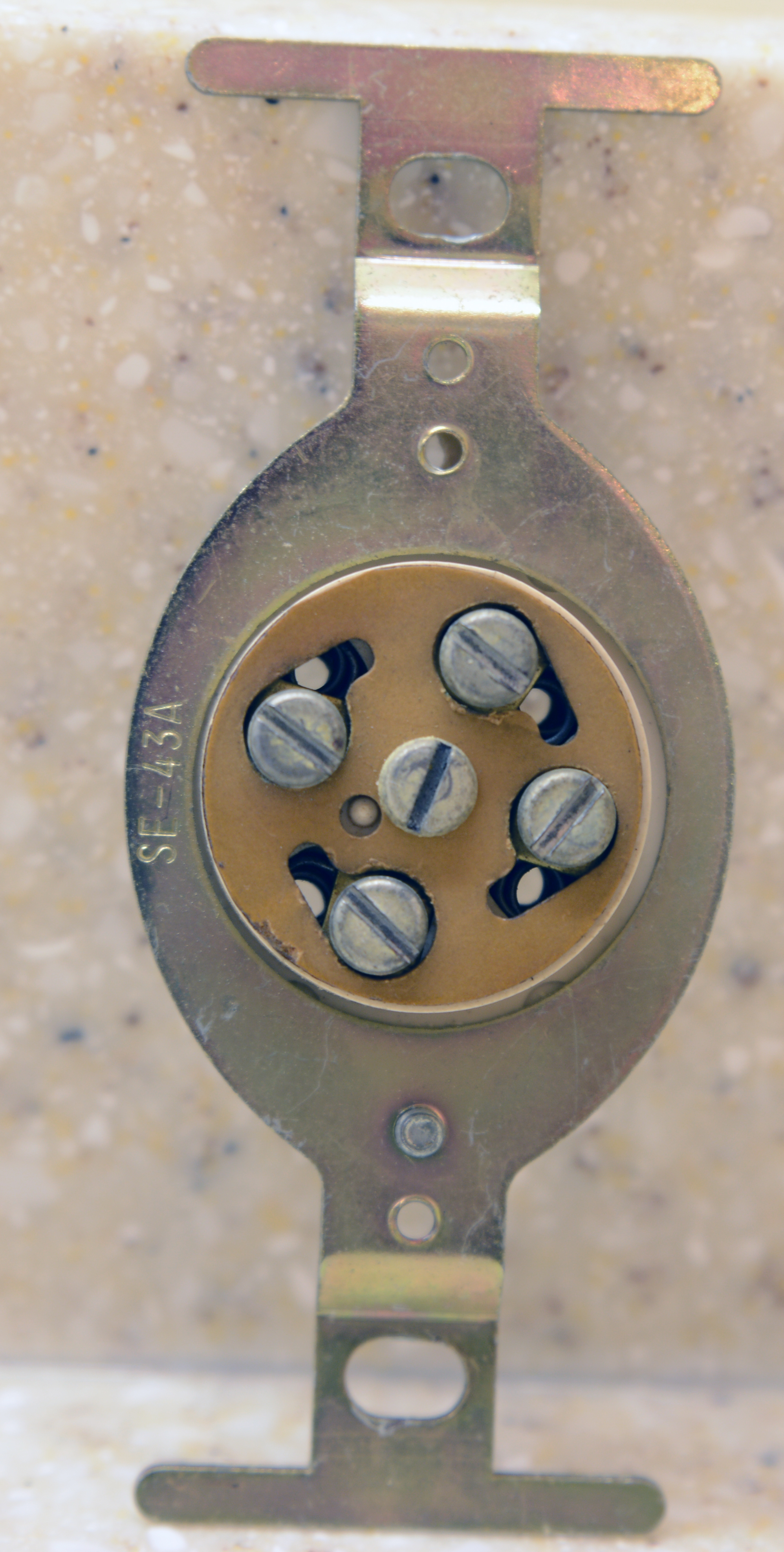
The back of a US four-pronged telephone jack (1964)

== Connections ==
The installation of a conventional wired telephone set has four connection points, each of which may be hardwired, but more often use a plug and socket:

- telephone line to phone cord: The wall jack. This connection is the most standardized, and often regulated as the boundary between an individual's telephone and the telephone network. In many residences, though, the boundary between utility-owned and household-owned cabling is a network interface on an outside wall known as the demarcation point; all wall jacks in the home are part of the household's internal wiring.
- telephone cord to telephone set base: This connection is generally not regulated, but instead follows de facto standards. It is often a 6P4C connector, which is often RJ11, but may be proprietary or hardwired.
- telephone set base to handset cord: By de facto standard, this is usually a 4P4C connector.
- handset cord to handset: The handset end of the straight-through handset cord also uses a 4P4C connector.

Some of these may be absent: Wired telephones may not have a separate base and handset. The defining characteristic of wireless telephones is that they do not have a handset cord, and the defining characteristic of mobile telephones is that they do not have a phone cord.

== Wiring ==
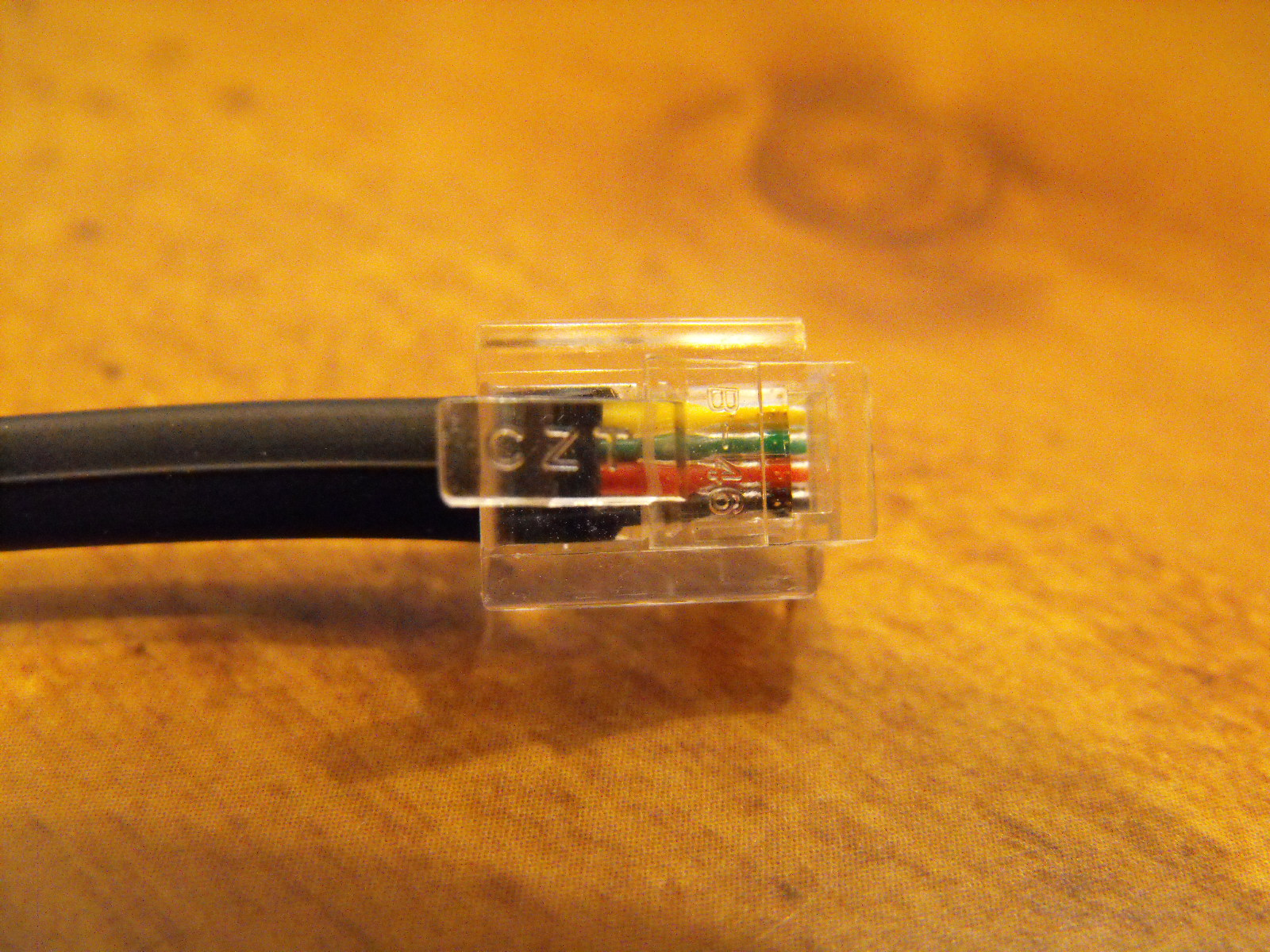
Typical U.S. modular phone connector

A standard specifies both a physical connector and how it is wired. Sometimes the same connector is used by different countries but wired in different ways.

For example, telephone cables in the UK typically have a BS 6312 (UK standard) plug at the wall end and a 6P4C or 6P2C modular connector at the telephone end: this latter may be wired as per the RJ11 standard (with pins 3 and 4), or it may be wired with pins 2 and 5, as a straight-through cable from the BT plug (which uses pins 2 and 5 for the line, unlike RJ11, which uses pins 3 and 4). Thus cables are not in general compatible between different phones, as the phone base may have a socket with pins 2 and 5 (requiring a straight-through cable), or have an RJ11 socket (requiring a crossover cable).

When modular connectors are used, the latch release of the connector should be on the ridge side of flat phone wire in order to maintain polarity.

Though four wires are typically used in U.S. phone cabling, only two are necessary for telecommunication. In the event that a second line is needed, the other two are used. They are also sometimes used to provide power for telephone dial lamps (6 volts AC, as in the Princess phone), or other features.

== List of plugs ==
=== Modular connectors ===
- 4P4C and 4P2C for handset cables (often erroneously referred to as RJ9, RJ10, and RJ22)
- 6P2C for RJ11 single telephone line
- 6P4C for RJ14 two telephone lines
- 6P6C for RJ25 three telephone lines
- 8P8C for RJ61X four telephone lines, RJ48S and RJ48C for four-wire data lines, RJ31X single telephone line with equipment disconnect, RJ38X (similar to RJ31X but with continuity circuit)

=== Other connectors ===
- 50-pin miniature ribbon connector for RJ21X, used for up to 25 lines for multiline phones such as the ITT 2564, key telephone systems such as the 1A2 Key System, and PBX systems.

=== International standards ===
- RJ11, by far the most common
- BS 6312, British
- F-010, French
- TAE connector, German

=== National standards ===
- TDO-connector, Austria
- WT-4, Polish and Eastern Bloc national standard, also adopted in Russia as ШТР-IV (SHTR-IV)
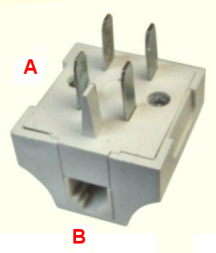
WT-4 telephone plug (A) with RJ11 outlet (B)

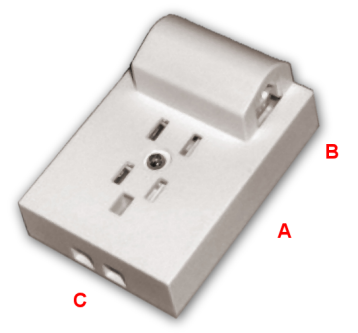
GTN-4 telephone socket (A) with additional RJ11 socket (B)

The Polish WT-4 plug is also adopted in the Eastern Bloc and Russia as ШТР-IV (SHTR-IV) and has four metal pins and an additional fourth dielectric pin. The corresponding socket comes in two variants. The GTN-4 socket (РТШ-IV (RTSH-IV) in Russia) provides a 4 pin connection (in most cases, the two rightmost pins are used for connecting a single line). The GTNC-4 (РТШК-IV, RTSHK-IV) is a GTN-4 socket that has an additional circuit. The 5th plastic pin of the inserted plug disconnects a 1μF capacitor that otherwise closes the circuit of the telephone line when the plug is not inserted. This feature allows testing the line when the phone is not plugged in. The usage of a capacitor is mostly obsolete and GTN-4 sockets produced later reuse the capacitor compartment for an additional RJ11 socket.

=== Legacy ===
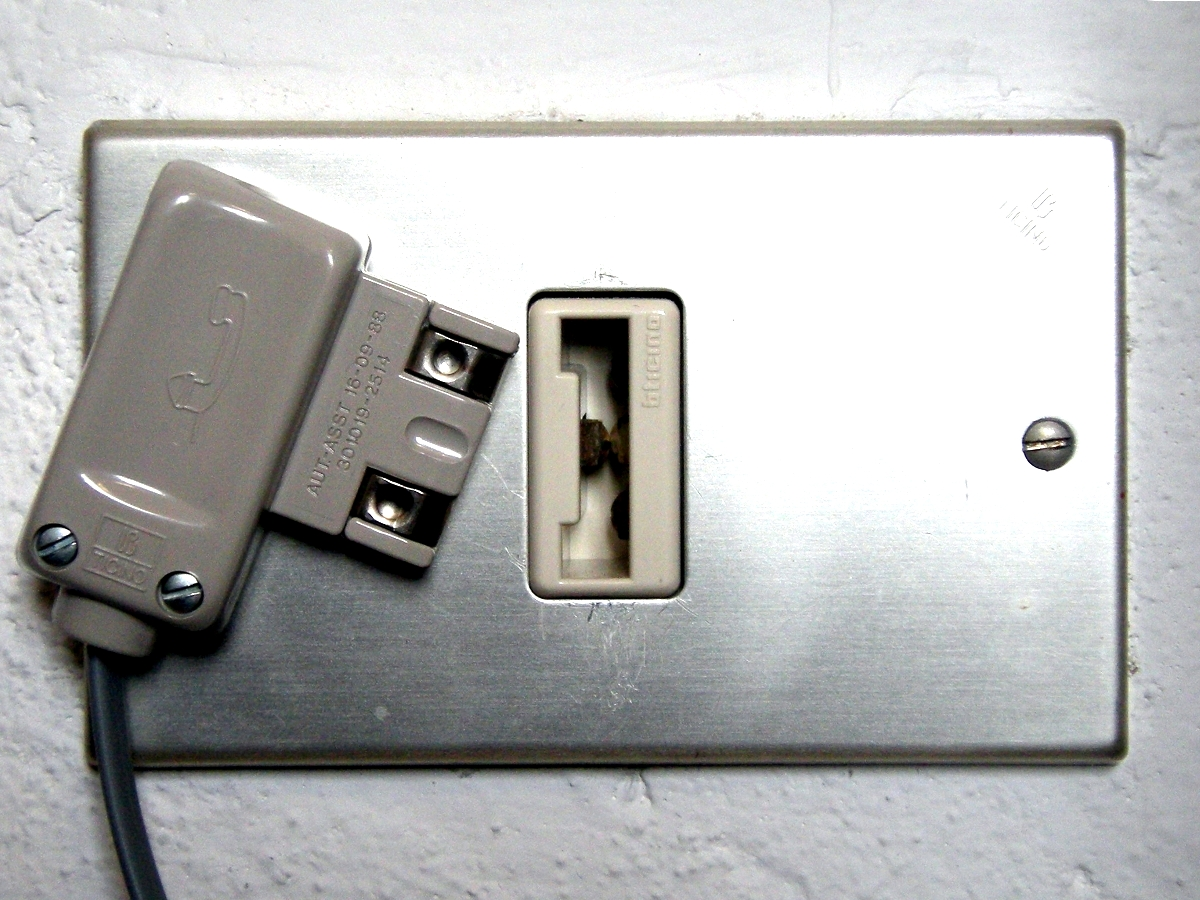
BTicino telephone plug and socket

- 600 series connector, Australia
- Protea, South Africa
- SS 455 15 50, Sweden and Iceland
- Telebrás plug, Brazil
- Tripolar plug, Italy
- BTicino 2021 (with or without line interruption), Italy (rare)

== List by country or territory ==
This list covers only single-line telephone plugs commonly used in homes and other small installations; there are 44 different variations of plugs, including an Israeli version of BS6312 with different internal wiring of the pins, plus hard wiring to a junction box with no adapter. Special telephone sets use a variety of special plugs, for example micro ribbon for key telephone systems.

| Place | Plug types |
|---|---|
| Albania | 6P2C |
| Algeria | F-010 |
| Argentina | 6P2C |
| Australia | 610, 6P2C |
| Austria | TDO |
| Barbados | 6P2C |
| Belarus | 6P2C, Polish national 5-pin (WT-4) (Note: Used in older installations) |
| Belgium | Tetrapolar plug, 6P2C |
| Bolivia | 6P2C |
| Bosnia | 6P2C, 3-pin plug used in countries of former Yugoslavia |
| Botswana | BS 6312 |
| Brazil | Telebrás plug, 6P2C |
| Brunei | 6P2C |
| Bulgaria | 6P2C, Polish national 5-pin (WT-4) |
| Canada | 6P2C |
| Cayman Islands | 6P2C |
| Chile | 6P2C |
| China Mainland | 6P2C |
| Colombia | 6P2C, 2-pin national standard |
| Costa Rica | 6P2C |
| Croatia | 6P2C, 3-pin plug used in countries of former Yugoslavia |
| Cyprus | BS 6312, 6P2C (Note: Used for ADSL) |
| Czech Republic | 6P2C, 4-pin national plug |
| Denmark | 3-prong national standard, 6P2C (Note: Used in newer installations) |
| Dominican Republic | 6P2C |
| Ecuador | 6P2C |
| Egypt | 6P2C (Note: Currently the dominant plug) |
| Estonia | 6P2C, Polish national 5-pin (WT-4) |
| Faroe Islands | 6P2C |
| Finland | 6P2C, Tripolar plug |
| France | F-010, 8P8C (Note: Often, although incorrectly referred to as "RJ45") (since 2003) |
| Germany | TAE, 8P8C (Note: Used for ISDN) |
| Gibraltar | BS 6312 |
| Greece | 6P2C, (Note: Although other types can also be found) Bipolar plug |
| Hong Kong | 6P2C, BS 6312 |
| Hungary | 6P2C, legacy 3 and 5-prong national standard |
| Iceland | 6P2C, SS 455 15 50 |
| India | 6P2C |
| Indonesia | 6P2C |
| Iran | 6P2C |
| Ireland | 6P2C, 8P8C, (Note: Used for ISDN, Digital PBX, and office systems) |
| Israel | BS 6312 but wired differently from the British Standard, 6P2C |
| Italy | 6P2C, Tripolar plug, BTicino-2021 |
| Japan | 6P2C |
| Korea, Republic of | 6-pin modular (6P4C or 6P2C), 8-pin modular (8P8C) or 3-position weatherproof connector in accord with TIA-1096-A. (Note: Legal regulation) 4-prong connector (Note: The old standard ruled out after 2002 but still used widely.) |
| Latvia | 6P2C, Polish national 5-pin (WT-4) |
| Lithuania | 6P2C, Polish national 5-pin (WT-4) |
| Liechtenstein | Reichle-connector, 4-pin Swiss telephone plugs |
| Luxembourg | 6P2C, 4-pin Luxembourgish telephone plug |
| Malaysia | 6P2C |
| Malta | BS 6312, 6P2C |
| Mauritius | F-010 |
| Mexico | 6P2C |
| Montenegro | 6P2C, 3-pin plug used in countries of former Yugoslavia |
| Morocco | F-010, 6P2C |
| Myanmar | BS 6312 |
| Netherlands | 6P2C, PTT plug |
| Nigeria | 6P2C |
| New Zealand | BS 6312, 6P2C, 8P8C |
| North Macedonia | 6P2C, 3-pin plug used in countries of former Yugoslavia |
| Norway | 8P8C, (Note: Same plug used for POTS, ISDN and LAN) Tripolar plug, 6-prong national standard (Note: For local battery telephones, not used since approximately 1980) |
| Pakistan | 6P2C |
| Panama | 6P2C |
| Peru | 6P2C |
| Philippines | 6P2C |
| Poland | 6P2C, Polish national 5-pin (WT-4) coupled with 6P2C socket |
| Portugal | 6P2C (Note: Also known as R.I.T.A.) |
| Romania | 6P2C, 3-pin triangular plug similar to the Italian Tripolar plug, (Note: Rarely used today) 5-pin R.S.-79.809 (Note: Same as the Polish WT-4) |
| Russia | 6P2C, Polish national 5-pin (WT-4) |
| Senegal | F-010 |
| Serbia | 6P2C, 3-pin plug used in countries of former Yugoslavia |
| Singapore | 6P2C |
| Slovenia | 6P2C, 3-pin plug used in countries of former Yugoslavia |
| Slovakia | 6P2C, 4-pin national plug |
| South Africa | 6P2C, Protea, 8P8C |
| Spain | 6P2C |
| Sri Lanka | 6P2C |
| Sweden | SS 455 15 50, 6P2C |
| Switzerland | Reichle-connector, 4-pin plugs |
| Taiwan | 6P2C |
| Thailand | 6P2C |
| Trinidad and Tobago | 6P2C |
| Turkey | 6P2C, Tripolar plug |
| Tunisia | 6P2C, F-010 |
| Ukraine | 6P2C, Polish national 5-pin (WT-4) |
| United Arab Emirates | BS 6312 |
| United Kingdom | BS 6312, 6P2C (Note: Used for ADSL modem lines in British telephone sockets) |
| United States | 6P2C and other Registered jacks, 4-pin Bell System plugs |
| Uruguay | 6P2C |
| USSR (history) | Polish national 5-pin (WT-4) |
| Venezuela | 6P2C |
| Zimbabwe | BS 6312, 6P2C |

== See also ==
- Network interface device
- Power plugs/sockets by country
