= TDO =

TDO may refer to:

- Thiourea dioxide
- TDO connector, the telephone plug used in Austria.
- The Delicious One, the mascot of the Wienerschnitzel restaurant
- Tryptophan 2,3-dioxygenase, an enzyme in the metabolism of tryptophan
- Tricho–dento–osseous syndrome, a rare genetic disorder affecting hair, teeth, and bones.
- Teen Dance Ordinance, a law in Seattle enacted after morality crusades against all-ages nightclubs.
- TDO Full form, , Stands for Trust Rehabilitation and Development Organization. It is a humanitarian organization in Sudan.
