= R&M =

R&M may refer to:

- Reichle & De-Massari (R&M) is a Swiss family business specializing in information and communications technology.
- Urinalysis, also known as routine and microscopy (R&M), is an array of tests performed on urine.
- Rick and Morty, American animated TV show
