= Tetrapolar plug =

Electronic And Telecommunications Plug

A standard tetrapolar telephone plug in electronics and telecommunications, has four round metal pins and one plastic pin. The design is only used in Belgium for telephone wiring. It is similar to the tripolar telephone plug of Italy and also the Swedish telephone plug.

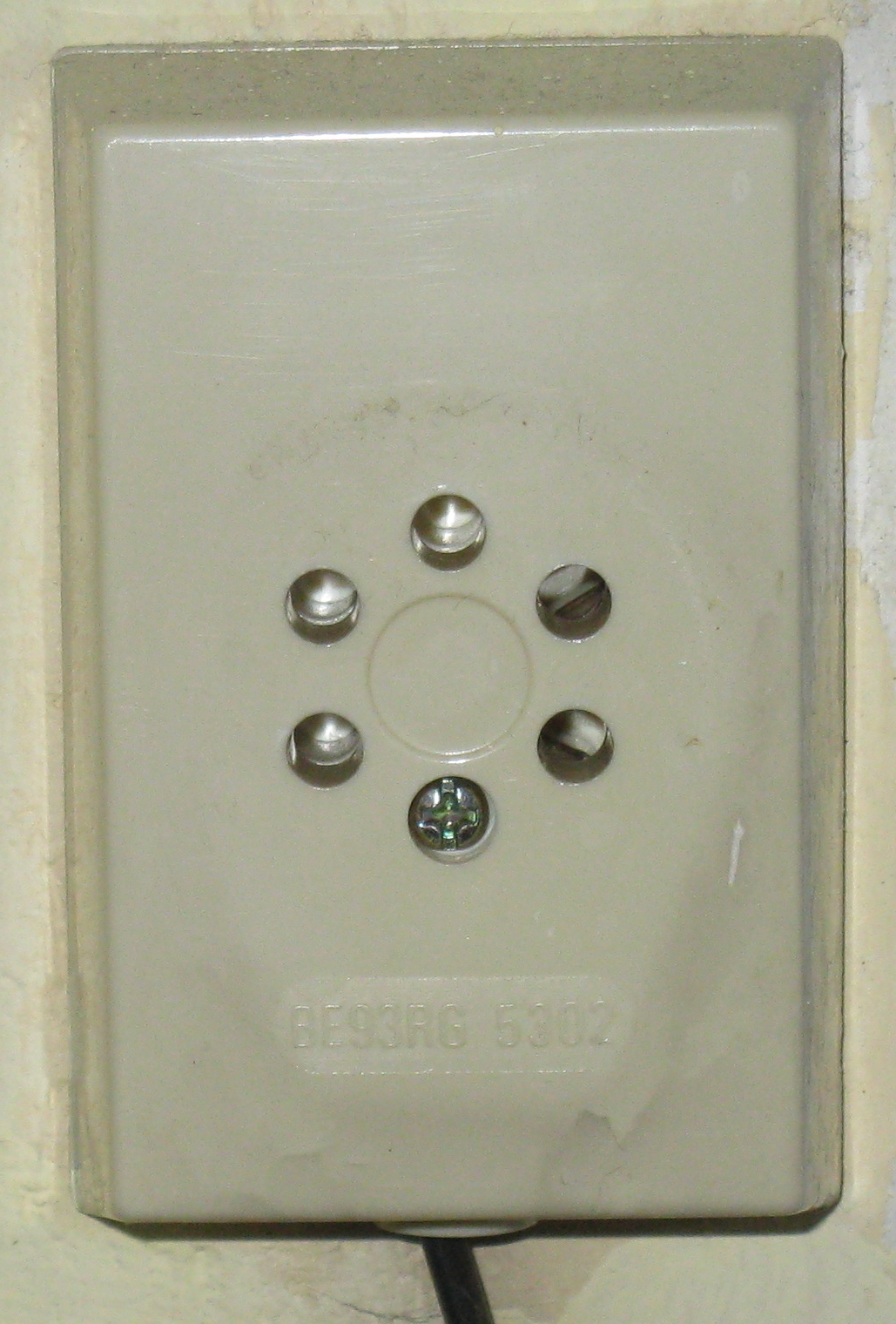
Belgian tetrapolar telephone jack.

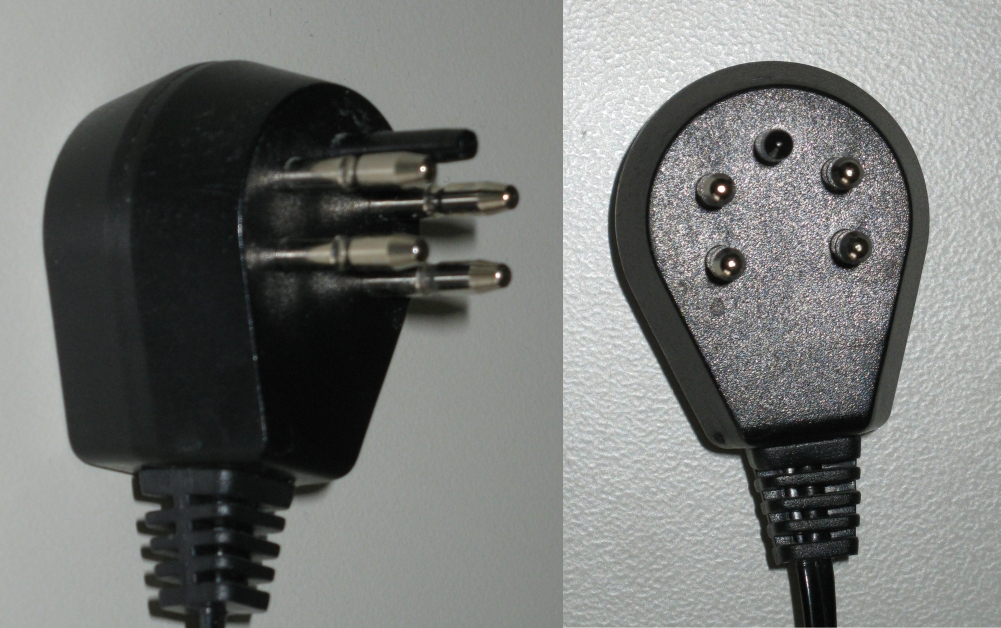
Belgian tetrapolar telephone plug. Note the four metal pins and the single plastic pin.

The plastic pin adds a presence function. When not inserted into a jack, the jack itself (mechanically) connects the incoming line to the next socket. The article on the Swedish telephone plug details its functional principles.
