= WT-4 =

Polish telephone plug

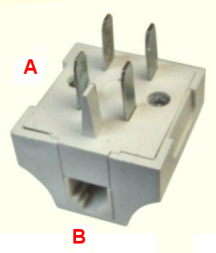
A WT-4 plug (A) with an RJ-11 adapter (B)

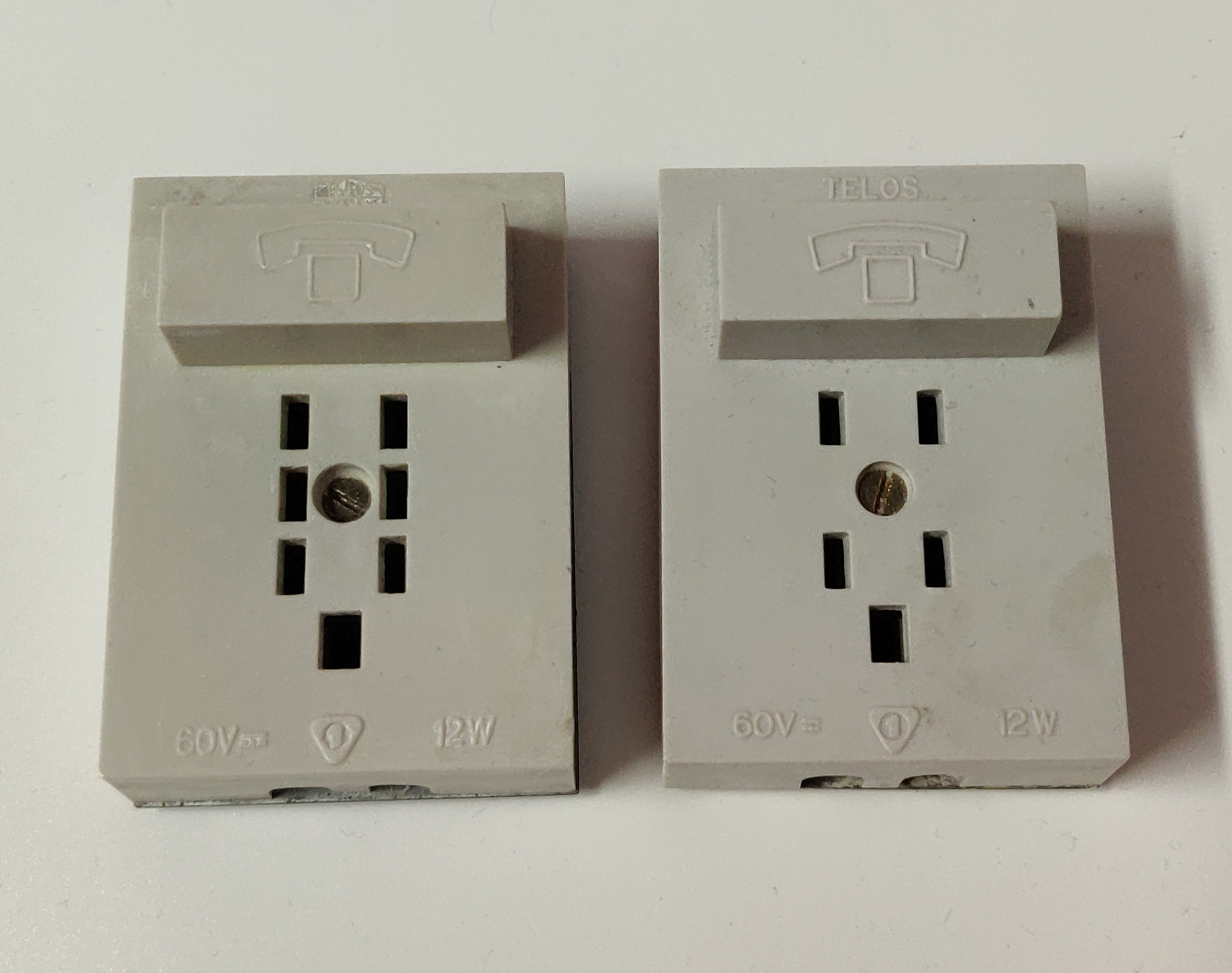
GTN-6 (left) and GTN-4 (right) sockets produced by Telos-Kraków.

WT-4 (adopted as ВТ-4 in the USSR) is a Polish telephone plug used to connect telephone sets to the network. Introduced in the second half of the 20th century and adopted in several Eastern Bloc countries as a standard. It has since been replaced by the RJ-11 standard. Sockets are labelled with the text GTN-4 (РТШ-4 in the USSR).

WT-4 plugs consist of 4 metal pins with an additional plastic pin at the bottom to prevent inserting the plug the wrong way round. When the plug is inserted into a socket, the plastic pin also disconnects a 1μF capacitor built into the socket. When connected, the capacitor simulates a telephone set with the handset hung up. This allows for the testing of the line even when the subscriber doesn't have a telephone connected to the network. In the mid-1990s, installations of WT-4 plugs began to be phased out, and the standardized shape of the socket was used to install RJ-11 connectors instead.

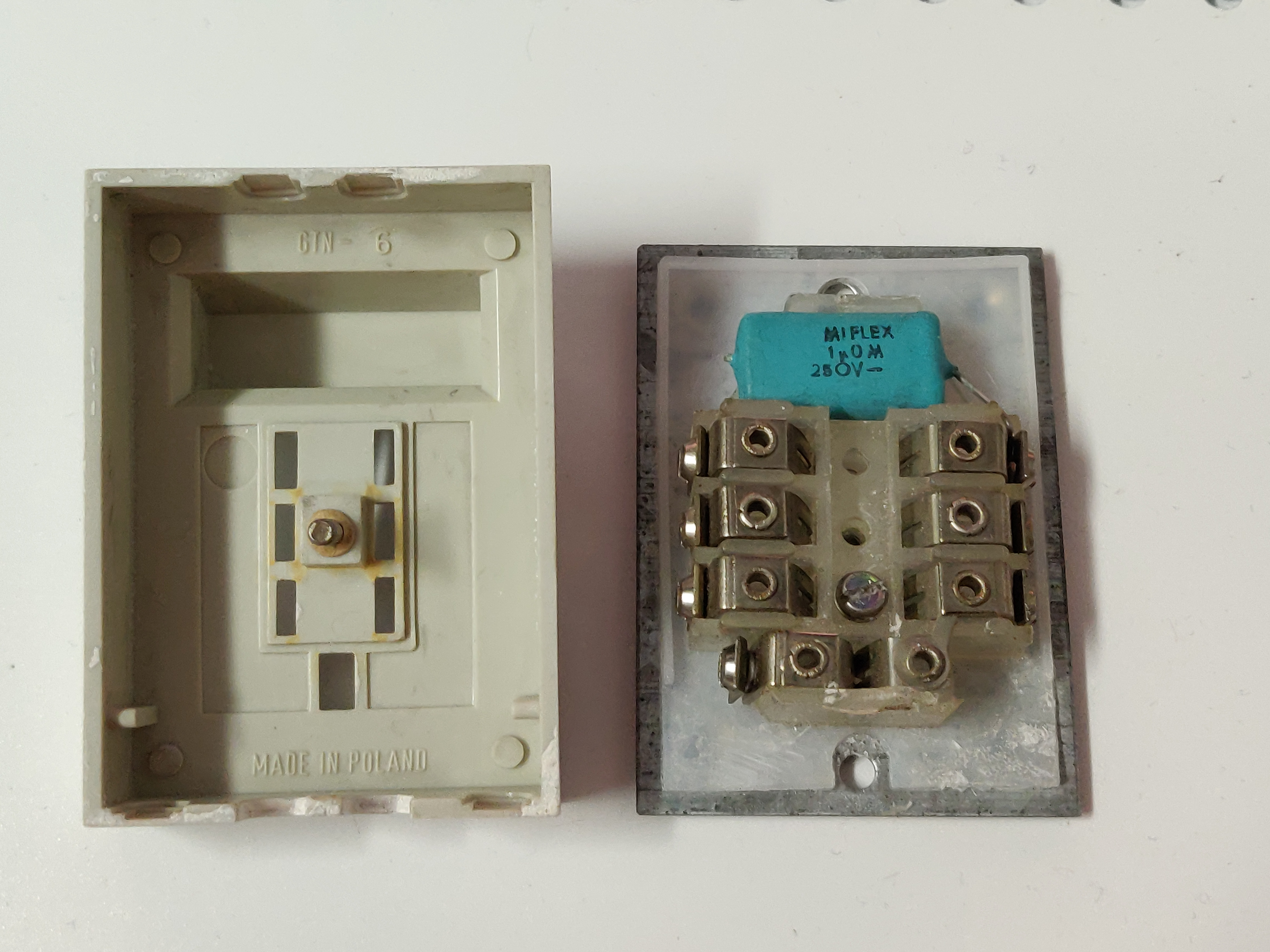
The inside of a GTN-6 plug. Visible above the contacts is the 1μF capacitor.

A rare 6-pin version also existed, called WT-6. Extra pins (numbered with the missing 1 and 2) were located between the existing pins 3 and 5, and 4 and 6, respectively. These extra pins were used for powering telephone sets with illuminated rotary dials, as well as some more advanced telephone installations.

Sockets and plugs according to Polish BN-90/3213-22 and Soviet GOST 8810-81 standards
Socket		Socket with capacitor		Plug		Number of pins
BN	GOST	BN	GOST	BN	GOST	Number of pins
GTN-4	РТШ-4 (RTSh-4)	GTN-4c	РТШК-4 (RTShK-4)	WT-4	ВТ-4 (VT-4)	4
GTN-6	РТШ-6 (RTSh-6)	GTN-6с	РТШК-6 (RTShK-6)	WT-6	ВТ-6 (VT-6)	6

Socket pin-out
Function, notes	Pin number in GTN (RTSh) socket			Function, notes
Ground. Used in sets with grounding buttons when working with internal telephone exchanges	6 (1)		5 (а)	Telephone line B, in GTN-4c connected with capacitor
GTN-6 advanced features. Not present in GTN-4	2 (3)		1 (4)	GTN-6 advanced features. Not present in GTN-4
In a plug bridged with pin 5 (а). Used to connect an additional bell when phone plug is connected	4 (2)		3 (б, b)	Telephone line A
In GTN-4c connected with capacitor	8 (5)	Socket switch pins, disconnected on plug insertion	7 (6)	Permanently connected with pin 3 (б) in socket

== See also ==
- Telephone jack and plug
