= TAE connector =

German standard for telephone plugs and sockets

TAE (Telekommunikations-Anschluss-Einheit or telecommunications connection unit) is the German standard for telephone plugs and sockets.

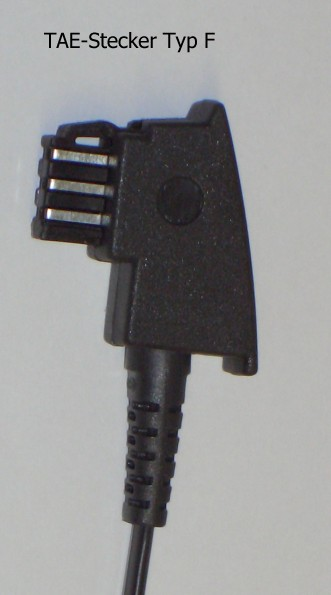
TAE plug

The standard covers two TAE types: F ("Fernsprechgerät": for telephones) and N ("Nebengerät" or "Nichtfernsprechgerät": for other devices such as answering machines and modems). U-coded sockets and plugs are universal connectors suitable for both device types.

E-coded connectors that are used in EAD-sockets are not intended for telephony applications.

== History ==
The TAE system was introduced in the late 1980s before the German government-owned institution Deutsche Bundespost (DBP, German Federal Post) was divided into Deutsche Post (postal service), Deutsche Telekom (telecommunication services) and Postbank (financial services). Previously, the older VDo type connectors had been used, or telephones had been hardwired to their (ADo) wall sockets, and only officially approved telephones (legally distributable only by the DBP) were allowed to be connected to the telephone system. Furthermore, telephones and other communication devices could only be leased from the DBP and not be sold or bought on the free market.

The introduction of the TAE system was the practical enabling technology of the legal specification in Germany that communication terminal equipment should be in the responsibility of end users. Subsequently, many communication devices became available in the open market that could be plugged into standard TAE sockets. Adaptors allow for connecting devices with registered jacks that are more prevalent internationally.

Today, TAE connectors are common in Germany and other central European countries like Liechtenstein and Luxembourg. Modern TAE sockets also contain circuits referred to as passiver Prüfabschluss, meaning passive test termination. This provides a discernible condition to the telephone exchange indicating that the line is continuous to the TAE-connected device.

== TAE socket ==
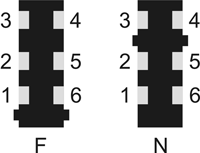
TAE socket

A typical TAE installation is a multi-socket junction box with at least one N connector and one F connector socket in the box, but having usually two N and one F connector. Up to three N connectors are possible. Network service enters the box and connects to pins 1 and 2 on the right-most N connector. Service is daisy-chained from pins 5 and 6 on the N connector to pins 1 and 2 on the next N connector to the left. The F connector is attached to pins 5 and 6 on the last N connector at the end of the chain.

== TAE plug ==
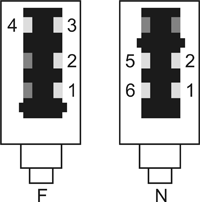
TAE plug

(Image shown with flat side of connector down and the metallic pins facing you. The cable pigtail exits at the bottom of the connector)

When wiring a TAE plug, a mirror image of the illustration (pins 1 through 3 are on the left side) should be used, if wiring the connector with the flat side up.

== Observations ==
As the TAE connector does not have gold contacts, the contacts may oxidize, which can cause sizzling and crackling noises in analog voice transmission.

Looping the a2 and b2 wires out of the TAE is related to the routing the line through instruments in a house in order that no extension may overhear another.

== Pin-out ==
Pin	Name	Used for	Color of the wire (DIN 47100)
1	La	Exchange line a	White
2	Lb	Exchange line b	Brown
3	W	Line for external bell (obsolete since mid-1990s)	Green
4	E	Line for ground connection, used to request an external connection in very old telephone installations	Yellow
5	b2	Line b, looped through the telecommunication device	Pink
6	a2	Line a, looped through the telecommunication device	Gray

== See also ==
- TDO connector
