= F-010 =

Type of telephone connector

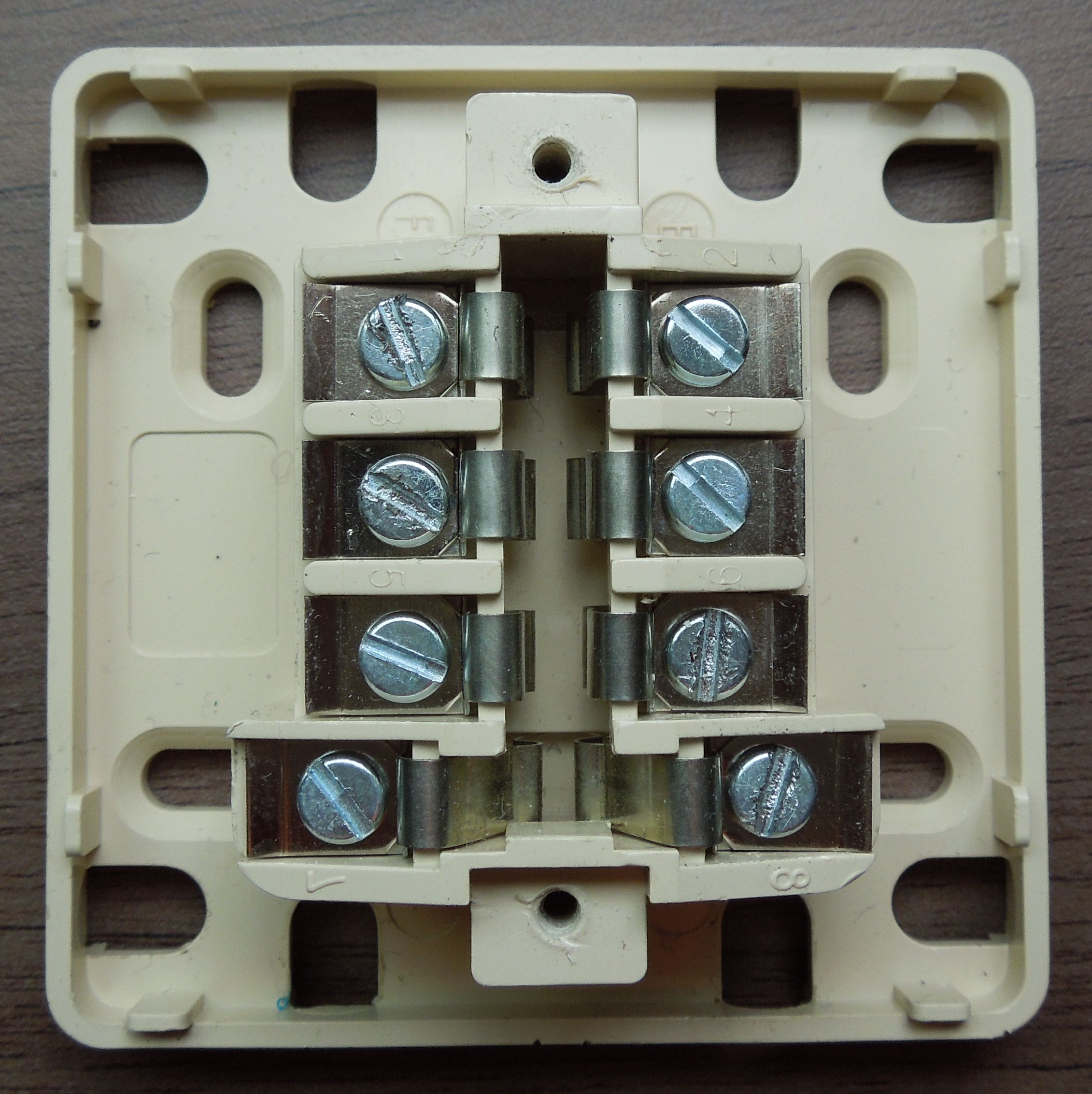
Open telephone socket

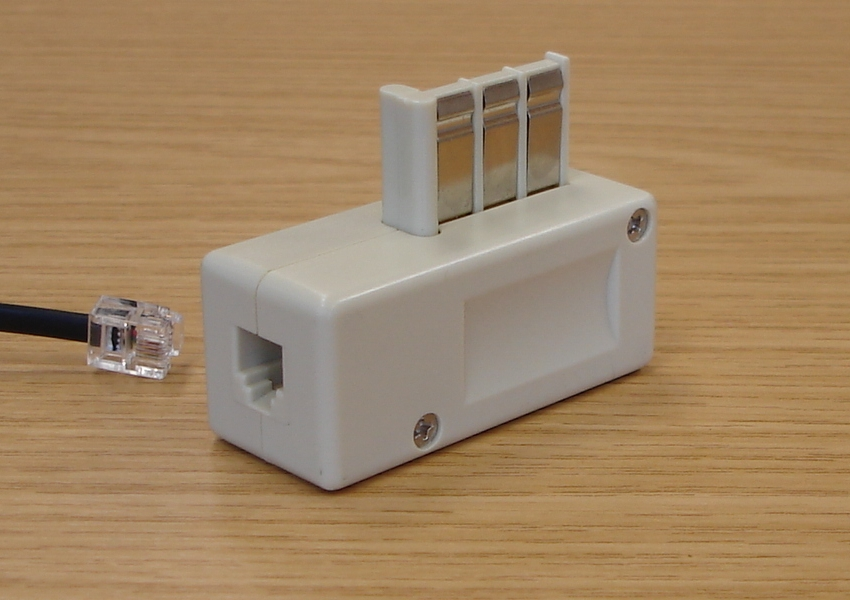
F-010 plug with RJ11 socket

F-010 or T plug or PTT plug is a type of telephone plug and matching socket. The F-010 standard originated in France and is used there (overseas departments and territories included) and in other countries, including Algeria, Andorra, Bhutan, Burkina Faso, Chad, Comoros, Republic of the Congo, Djibouti, Egypt, Equatorial Guinea, Gabon, Grenadines, Italy, Ivory Coast, Madagascar, Mali, Mauritania, Mauritius, Monaco, Morocco, Niger, Rwanda, Senegal, Somalia, Togo and Tunisia.

The F-010 is described in Spécifications techniques d'interface edited by France Télécom.

In France, it has been replaced by RJ45 since the NF C 15-100 standard in 2008, mandatory for any new construction.
