= Protea (telephone) =

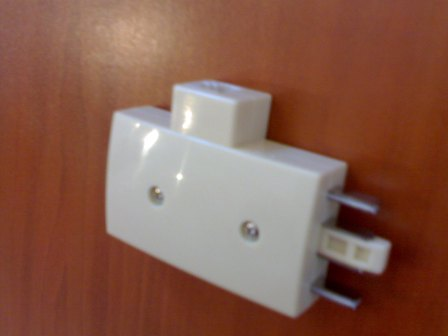
Adapter to plug an RJ11 plug into an old Protea telephone jack

The Protea telephone plug, sometimes called simply the South African telephone plug, was widely used in South Africa from the 1970s until the 1990s. As of 2004, telephone installations in South Africa use RJ11 plugs (which are sometimes referred to in South Africa as Venus plugs), but Protea plugs are still often encountered in older installations.
