= Tripolar plug =

Italian telephone plug

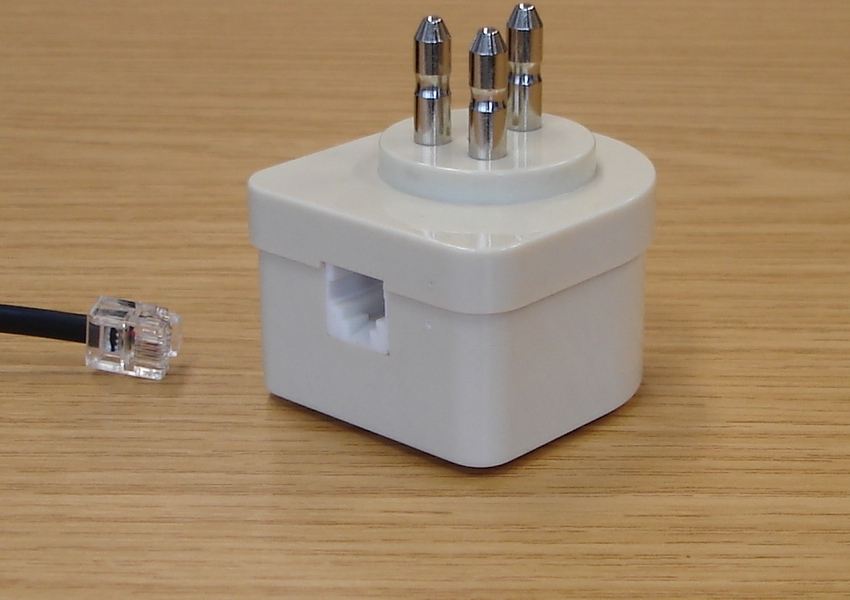
A tripolar plug-RJ11 adapter

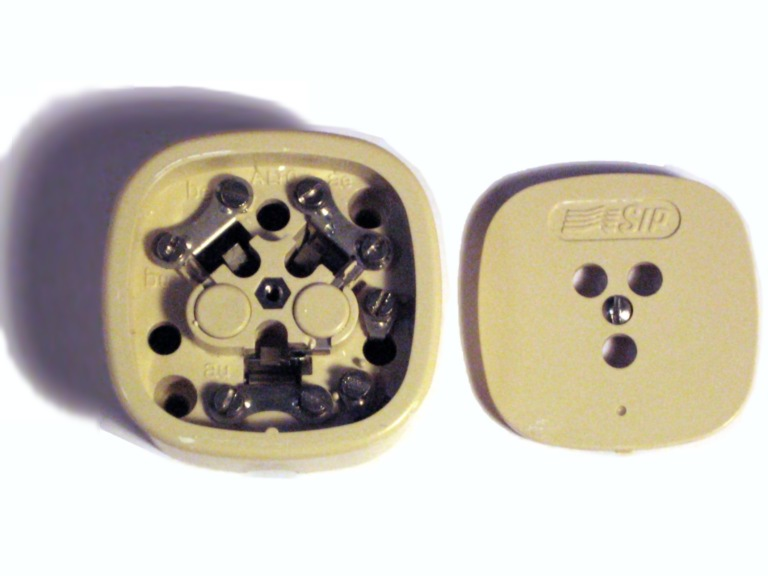

The telefonic tripolar plug is the first type of telephone plug used in Italy. It has also been used in Finland, Norway and Turkey in older installations.

== Structure ==
It uses three pins: the two on the top are joined with the twisted pair of cables bringing the signal; the third, off-center, can be used for loop through when more sockets exist. In Finland, the third pin is earth ground, but it is rarely connected.

Every socket complies with Italian standards. Formerly each of them was installed by SIP, now TIM, and had their trademark. Sockets without trademark exist also. Since 2007, TIM no longer installs tripolar sockets in new electrical wiring systems.

Tripolar plugs may be installed with protection fuses.

In Finland, there is a five-pin variant with a second line. The three-pin plug is compatible with a five-hole socket.

== Use ==
The tripolar plug has been supplanted by the international RJ11 standard, both because it is more diffused in new technology devices and because the tripolar plug isn't suitable for ISDN.
