= Swedish telephone plugs & sockets =

Type of plug

A standard Swedish telephone plug carries one telephone line and has four flat metal pins and one plastic pin. The design is used only by Televerket (now Telia Company) in Sweden and older Póstur og Sími (now Síminn) installations in Iceland (RJ11 and a data/voice standard using an 8P8C modular connector are used in more recent buildings). Neither plug nor socket is compatible with other plugs and sockets. It is defined in Swedish Standard SS 455 15 50.

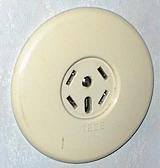
Swedish telephone socket of older design. The four angled slots are the connectors while the bigger slot in the lower middle is the presence slot. Above it is a screw. The embossed text underneath the circular indention reads “TELE”

== Sockets connected in cascade ==
When there is only one socket in a house or apartment, the incoming line is connected to the two lower receptacles and the upper receptacles are left unused. When a subscriber has more than one telephone socket, they typically are connected so that two telephones can not be connected to the telephone exchange at the same time. This is done by connecting the two upper receptacles of a socket to the lower receptacles of the next socket. When a connected telephone's handset is lifted, the two twisted pair connections are separated, thus disconnecting any telephones downward in the chain.

The plastic pin adds a presence function. When not inserted into a jack, the jack itself (mechanically) connects the incoming line to the next socket.

The cascade topology makes installing a DSL splitter a matter of plugging it in the first socket since this socket provides both direct access to the PSTN and connections to the remaining sockets.

== Sockets connected in parallel ==
When all sockets on a line are connected in parallel only the lower pins on a Swedish Standard plug (middle connectors on RJ-plugs) are used. This configuration was earlier not allowed due to Swedish law prohibiting the possibility of eavesdropping on a telephone line (and possibly also to limit each household's load on the exchange). Parallel connection of sockets is now allowed but can be considered bad practice by some, and makes DSL splitter installation more cumbersome. The advantages include compatibility with foreign equipment and conference call-type communication.

== Other connectors used in Sweden ==
In addition to the standard Swedish plugs and sockets, RJ11 connectors are quite common, especially in offices. Even 8P8C modular telephone sockets can be found. Most telephone equipment sold in Sweden today has RJ11 sockets and corresponding cables with 6P4C plugs on each end and an adaptor from RJ11 to SS 455 15 50 sockets. The Swedish practice with sockets connected in cascade can be maintained with RJ plugs and sockets by using the first pair for connecting the terminal equipment to the PSTN and the second pair for the connection of a line towards the next socket. However, the presence function found in Swedish Standard sockets is lost, so disconnecting a telephone from its socket requires replacing it with a dummy plug so the sockets further down in the chain will remain connected.

6P6C modular plugs are also used for telephony, but only for certain telephone exchange systems - never for direct connection to the PSTN. ISDN telephones and outlets always have 8P8C modular connectors.

== See also ==
- Telephone jack and plug
- Registered jack

=== Reference and further reading ===
- Description of Network Interfaces; Analogue Access to PSTN from Telia (pdf) (archived from the original on 2014-05-01)
