= Reichle & De-Massari =

Swiss telecommunications company

Reichle & De-Massari Aktiengesellschaft AG
- Type: Public
- Industry: Information and communications technology
- Founded: 1964
- Founder: Hans Reichle, Renato De-Massari
- Headquarters: Wetzikon, Switzerland
- Key people: Roger Baumann (CEO); Thomas A. Ernst (chairman of the supervisory board)
- Revenue: 260.3 million CHF
- Number of employees: 1,785
- Website: www.rdm.com

Reichle & De-Massari Holding AG (R&M), is a globally active corporate group in the information and communication technology sector, based in Wetzikon, Switzerland. The family company develops and produces connecting technology for communications networks, such as fiber-optic distributors, patch panels, data and communications network connection modules, as well as cables, housings, and software.

== History ==
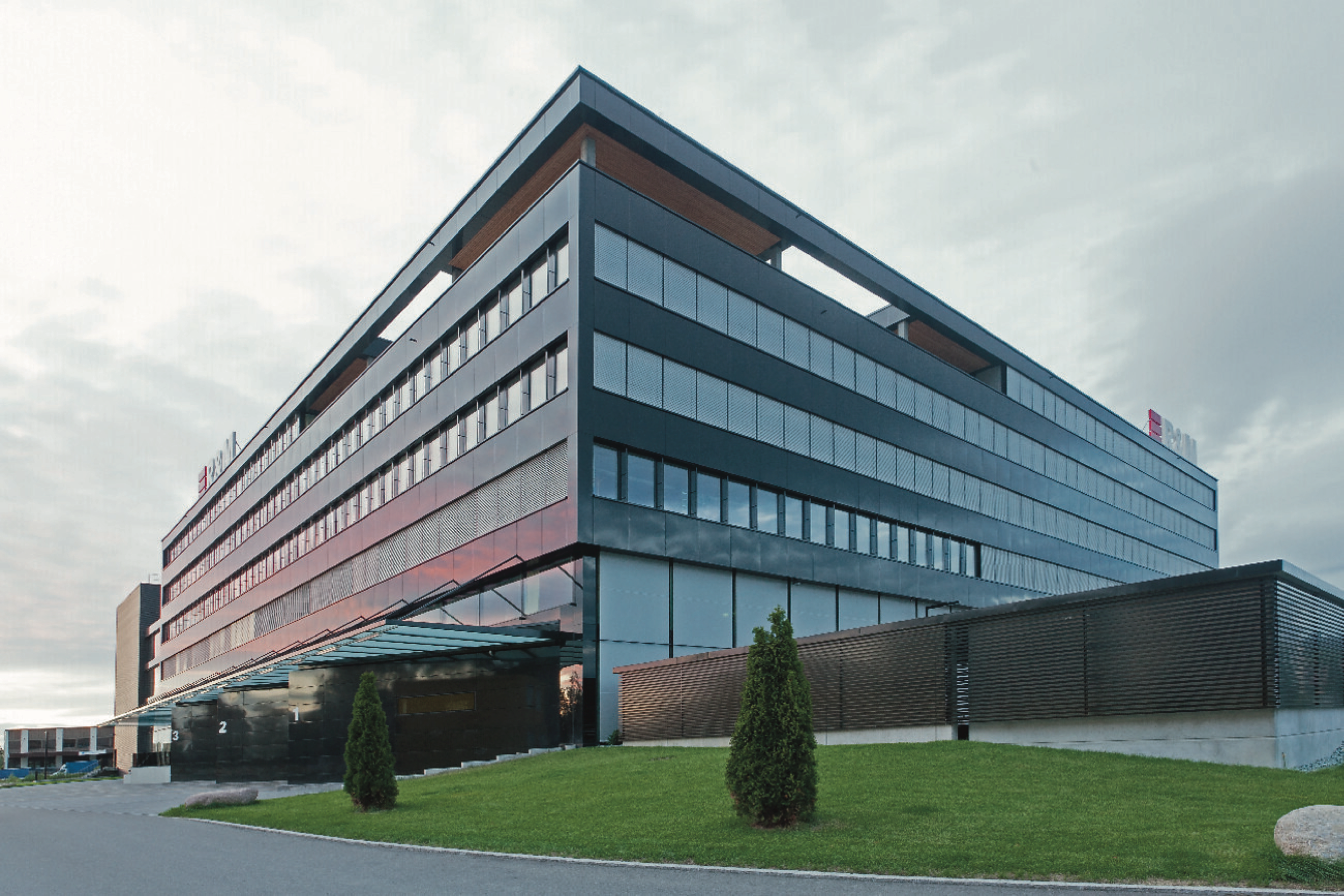
Reichle & De-Massari AG, company headquarters in Wetzikon, Switzerland, Canton ZH. The five-storey company building is names “Kubus”, or “Cube”. The R&M Kubus company headquarters, which opened in September 2010, is a low-exergy class building.

When they were still working for a supplier of what was then Swiss Telecom PTT (currently Swiss Post and Swisscom), Hans Reichle and Renato De-Massari had an idea for the development of a new, simpler to install telephone outlet. In 1964, they founded R&M as a two-man company to develop and produce what they called the Reichle connector. In subsequent years, the company extended its portfolio to include the entire connecting technology for data and voice networks based on copper cables for communications wiring. Fiber-optic communication technology was added in 1987.

In Poland, R&M opened its first Eastern European subsidiary in 1993 by founding Reichle & De-Massari Polska Sp.z.o.o., Warsaw.

Before Renato De-Massari died in 2000, his partner Hans Reichle took over the company as sole owner in 1996. In the years following, R&M drove international expansion by founding subsidiaries in Ukraine (Reichle & De-Massari Ukraine Ltd.), Malaysia (Reichle & De-Massari Malaysia) and Brazil (Reichle & De-Massari do Brasil Ltda.).

In 1999, Reichle & De-Massari merged all shares of the company in Reichle Holding AG as a holding company owned by the Reichle family. In the same year, Hans Reichle retired and became a member of the board of directors, handing over operational responsibility to his two sons Martin (chairman of the management board) and Peter (operational management), who from then on managed the company together with other members of the management board.

In 2006, R&M began to establish its own sales office and production in India. Two years later, the first management and logistics hub for the Asia-Pacific region was set up in Singapore. A subsidiary for product development and sales (Reichle & De-Massari Far East (Pte) Ltd.) had existed there since 1994. This was followed in 2009 by the establishment of a location in the United Arab Emirates. In 2010, the company moved into the R&M Kubus in Wetzikon, R&M's new corporate headquarters.

On September 1, 2012, Michel Riva was the first non-family member to be appointed CEO. Martin and Peter Reichle continue to be members of the six-man board of directors and, in that function, represent the interests of the owner family.

In July 2012, R&M opened a branch in the Dubai Freezone, where products are assembled for the regions Middle East and Africa (MEA), and Asia. In October 2012, a further fiber-optic production plant was commissioned in Sofia, Bulgaria. In the same year, the company opened a Saudi Arabian branch in Riyadh to pursue regional expansion plans and offer local customer service. In 2014, the company celebrated its 50th anniversary.

In February 2016, R&M acquired the fiber-optic specialist REALM Communications Group Inc. domiciled in Milpitas, California. The production and sales operations in North America have since been run as a subsidiary under the name R&M USA, Inc. In April 2017, R&M acquired the Brazilian corporate group Peltier Comércio e Industria LTDA (PETCOM), domiciled in Santa Rita do Sapucaí, the intention being to gain a foothold in the Southern American fiber-optic market. A production plant is part of the group.

The company Transportkabel DIXI a.s., domiciled in Děčín, Czech Republic, acquired in May 2018, was renamed Reichle & De-Massari Czech Republic a.s. in August 2018. This takeover has allowed R&M to produce its own fiber-optic cables for the very first time. Furthermore, R&M opened a new production facility for fiber-optic products in Bangalore, India, in August 2018. With this investment, R&M is supporting the Make in India initiative. In May 2024, the Indian production facility relocated to a larger building in Bagaluru, Bangalore. With 400 workplaces, this is now the largest production R&M facility.

With the takeover of Optimum Fiberoptics Inc. domiciled in Elkridge, Maryland, in March 2019, R&M further expanded its business activities in the US. In the same year, the company acquired Durack Intelligent Electric Co. Ltd., Jinshan District, Shanghai, a Chinese manufacturer of network cabinets and enclosures for data centers. In January 2022, R&M acquired a further manufacturer of network cabinets and enclosures for data centers, the Tecnosteel S.r.l. based in Brunello (VA), Italy. In the same year, Hans Hess, who had been chairman of the board of directors for 15 years, handed over his position to Thomas A. Ernst.

== Corporate ==
R&M is an unlisted public limited company under the umbrella of Reichle Holding AG and is owned by the brothers Martin and Peter Reichle.

Reichle & De-Massari's sales revenue amounted to CHF 260.3 million in the 2025 financial year. The company generates around 80 percent of its sales outside of Switzerland. At the end of 2025, the company employed 1,785 people. Roger Baumann is the chairman of the five-member executive board. The chairman of the five-member board of directors is Thomas A. Ernst.

The international production network has its own plants (in Brazil, Bulgaria, China, Germany, India, Poland, Dubai, Saudi Arabia, Czech Republic) as well as competence centers and warehouse locations. R&M has around 40 subsidiaries in Australia, Brazil, Bulgaria, China, Germany, Dubai, France, United Kingdom, India, Italy, the Netherlands, Poland, Singapore, Spain, Ukraine, Hungary and the US. The company is also represented by sales partners in other countries.

R&M cooperates to some extent with other manufacturers in the development of new connectivity technologies. Among other activities, R&M participates in the Single Pair Ethernet System Alliance to promote the single pair Ethernet (SPE) technology.

== Products ==
R&M develops, produces, and sells components and systems for communication and data networks. The company's cabling systems are used in office buildings and industry, for example. R&M also designs infrastructures and components for data centers. R&M develops fiber-optic cabling systems for nationwide broadband expansion to the subscriber (fiber to the home, FTTH). For network levels 3 and 4, R&M supplies ready-to-install systems such as main distributors, points of presence (PoP), cross connection cabinet, closures and building entry points (BEP).

Reichle & De-Massari's technology and product developments include:

- series production of the Cat. 6A connection module for Ethernet networks with RJ45 connectors. R&M used to have a sales partnership with IBM as part of the development of RJ45 connection modules for twisted-pair copper cabling.
- a Cat. 8.1 cabling system according to ISO/IEC 11801 for the fastest data transmission over twisted pair copper cables in local data networks (40 Gigabit Ethernet).
- a high-density fiber optic distributor with up to 120 ports per height unit in a 19'' rack (Netscale) and a fiber-optic distributor rack for up to 5376 plug connections (Prime).
- a field-terminable fiber-optic connector (FO Field).
- a connector housing with bayonet lock for fiber-optic network connections in weather-affected and harsh environments such as mobile radio and 5G antennas, mining, and industrial plants (HEC).
- a re-sealable dome closure with gel cold sealing for the underground fiber-optic distribution in public telecommunication networks as for nationwide broadband expansion (SYNO).
- a hardware and software system for management of data network and data center infrastructures (inteliPhy).
- a cabling system for Single Pair Ethernet (SPE) with connection modules, patch cables and installation cables in accordance with IEC 63171-1.
- A fibre optic cabling system for connecting the Remote Radio Heads of 5G mobile radio antennas and the antenna sites with fibre optic networks, called Fibre to the Antenna (FTTA)
- Software for planning, documentation, and management of data centers (inteliPhy).

The company was involved in technological developments, for example:

- sensors for automated infrastructure management (AIM) and data center infrastructure management (DCIM for the centralized, digitized monitoring of cables, ports, and connectors.
- push-pull mechanism for the axial, rear side operation of tightly packed connectors (quick release, QR).
- insulation displacement connection, IDC.
- foil technology for a non-continuous shielding of twisted-pair copper cables; whereby shielding is achieved with short shield patterns insulated from each other (wave reduction patterns, WARP).

== Sustainability ==
Since 2010, R&M has published an annual sustainability report. This provides information about the company's measures in accordance with its own sustainability strategy, the UN's 17 Sustainable Development Goals (SDGs), and the ten principles of the UN Global Compact. In 2026, sustainability rating agency EcoVadis awarded R&M the silver medal for its progress in sustainability.
