= TDO connector =

Telephone plug used by A1 Telekom Austria

TDO circuit diagram

TDO (Telefonsteckdose) is the telephone plug used by A1 Telekom Austria.

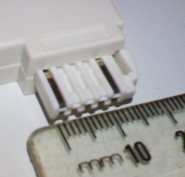
plug

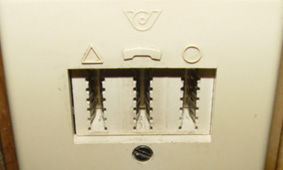
socket

The sample here has 6 conductors (of a possible 10), 2 on one side (visible in picture) and 4 on the opposite side. Connector dimensions are 3 mm × 18 mm (1/8 in × 3/4 in) (includes top latch).

The TDO forms part of the Austrian telephone connection system (Telefonstecksystem, TSS), and consists of the TDO telephone socket and the TST telephone plug. It was intended for the use in connecting telecommunications equipment to the Austrian analogue public switched telephone network. The connector system is described in the Austrian standard ÖNORM A 2640 and is assigned to the contacts.

== See also ==
- TAE connector
