= Networking cable =

Cables used to connect network devices

Networking cable is a piece of networking hardware used to connect one network device to other network devices or to connect two or more computers to share devices such as printers or scanners. Different types of network cables, such as coaxial cable, optical fiber cable, and twisted pair cables, are used depending on the network's topology, protocol, and size. The devices can be separated by a few meters (e.g. via Ethernet) or nearly unlimited distances (e.g. via the interconnections of the Internet).

While wireless networks are more easily deployed when total throughput is not an issue, most permanent larger computer networks utilize cables to transfer signals from one point to another.

There are several technologies used for network connections. Patch cables are used for short distances in offices and wiring closets. Electrical connections using twisted pair or coaxial cable are used within a building. Optical fiber cable is used for long distances or for applications requiring high bandwidth or electrical isolation. Many installations use structured cabling practices to improve reliability and maintainability. In some home and industrial applications, power lines are used as network cabling.

== Twisted pair ==
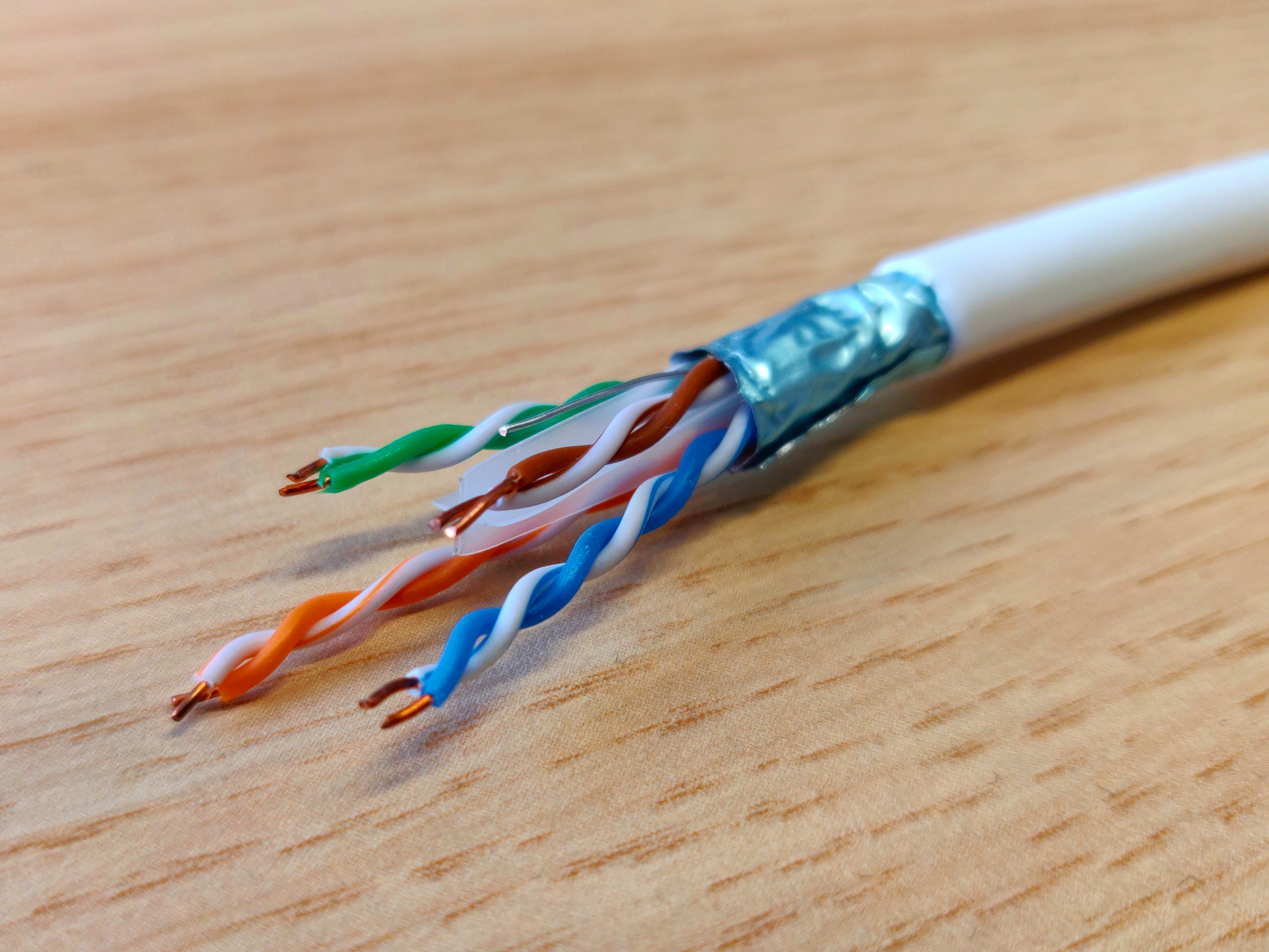
A twisted pair cable with shielding

Twisted pair cabling is a form of wiring in which pairs of wires (the forward and return conductors of a single circuit) are twisted together for the purposes of canceling out electromagnetic interference (EMI) from other wire pairs and from external sources. This type of cable is used for home and corporate Ethernet networks. Twisted pair cabling is used in short patch cables and in the longer runs in structured cabling.

There are two types of twisted pair cables: shielded and unshielded.

== Ethernet crossover cable ==
An Ethernet crossover cable is a type of twisted pair Ethernet cable used to connect computing devices together directly that would normally be connected via a network switch, Ethernet hub or router, such as directly connecting two personal computers via their network adapters. Most current Ethernet devices support Auto MDI-X, so it does not matter whether crossover or straight cables are used.

== Fiber optic cable ==
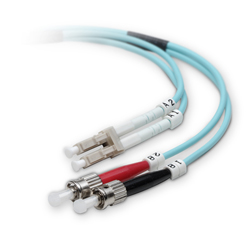
Multi-mode fiber cables with LC (top) and ST (bottom) optical fiber connectors, both with protective caps in place.

An optical fiber cable consists of a center glass core surrounded by several layers of protective material. The outer insulating jacket is made of Teflon or PVC to prevent interference. It is expensive but has higher bandwidth and can transmit data over longer distances. There are two major types of optical fiber cables: shorter-range multi-mode fiber and long-range single-mode fiber. Fiber optic cables use light signals to transmit data over long distances with high bandwidth and minimal signal loss.

== Coaxial cable ==
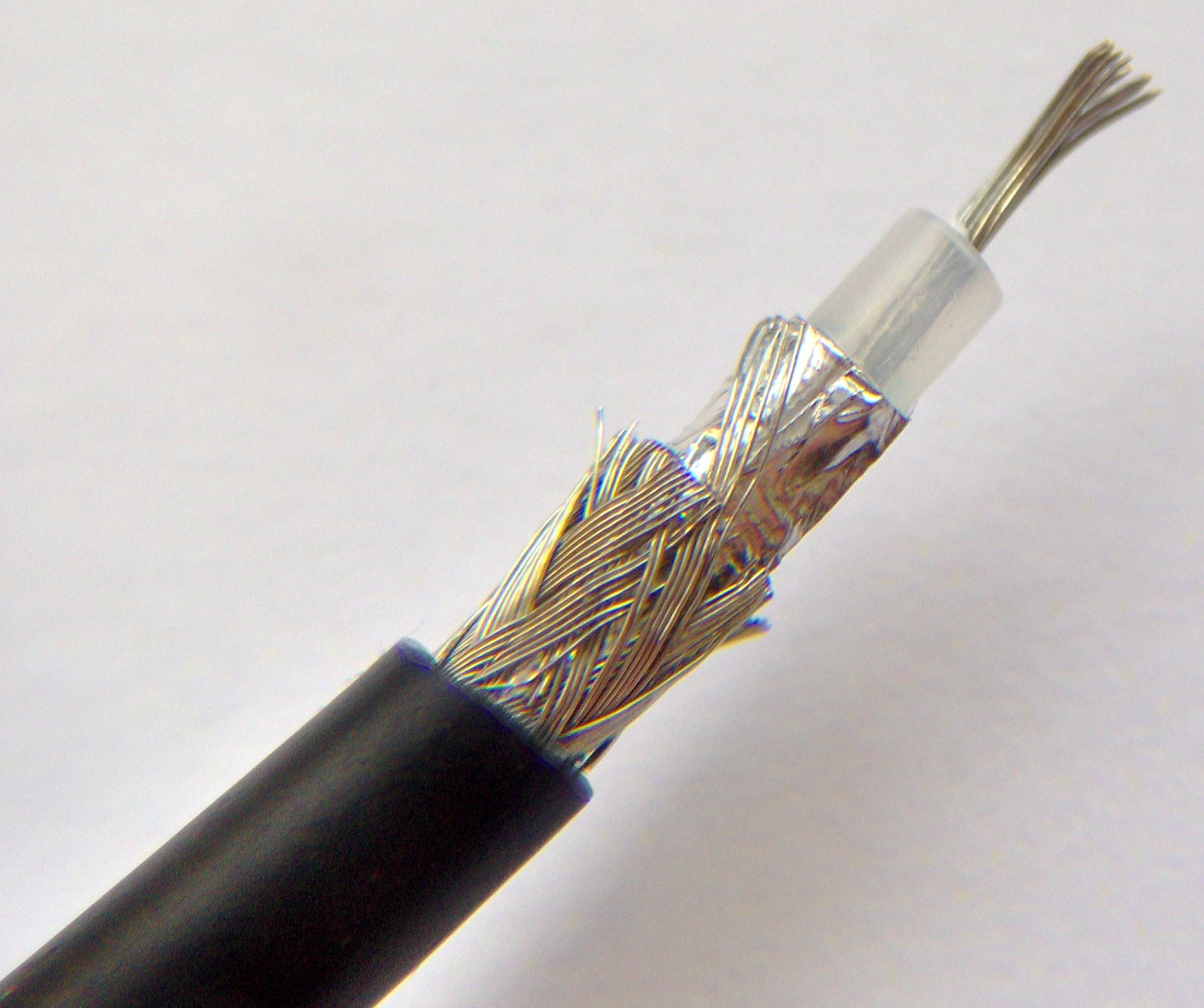
A coaxial cable has a central conductor surrounded by a sheath of conductor with insulation in between.

A coaxial cable forms a transmission line and confines the electromagnetic wave to an area inside the cable between the center conductor and the shield. The transmission of energy in the line occurs totally through the dielectric inside the cable between the conductors. Coaxial lines can therefore be bent and twisted (subject to limits) without negative effects, and they can be strapped to conductive supports without inducing unwanted currents in them.

Early Ethernet, 10BASE5 and 10BASE2, used baseband signaling over coaxial cables.

The most common use for coaxial cables is for television and other signals with a bandwidth of multiple megahertz. Although in most homes coaxial cables have been installed for transmission of TV signals, new technologies (such as the ITU-T G.hn standard) open the possibility of using home coaxial cable for high-speed home networking applications (Ethernet over coax).

== Patch cable ==
A patch cable is an electrical or optical cable used to connect one electronic or optical device to another for signal routing. Devices of different types (e.g., a switch connected to a computer or a switch connected to a router) are connected with patch cables. Patch cables are usually produced in many different colors so as to be easily distinguishable. In contrast to structured cabling, patch cables are more flexible.

== Power lines ==
Although power wires are not designed for networking applications, power line communication (PLC) allows these wires to also be used to interconnect home computers, peripherals or other networked consumer products. The HomePlug protocol family was an early PLC technology. In December 2008, the ITU-T adopted Recommendation G.hn/G.9960 as the first worldwide standard for high-speed powerline communications. G.hn also specifies techniques for communications over the existing category 3 cable used by phones and coaxial cable used by cable television in the home.

== See also ==
- ISO/IEC 11801, general-purpose telecommunication cabling
- Telecommunication cable
