= USOC =

USOC may stand for:

- United States Olympic & Paralympic Committee, formerly known as the United States Olympic Committee
- Universal Service Order Code for telephone wiring
- U.S. Open Cup – soccer competition
