= Pinout =

Mapping of the physical contacts of an electronic component

A pinout diagram of a very common 555 timer integrated circuit showing its eight pins (numbered 1-8) and their corresponding functions ("ground", "trigger", "output", etc.)

In electronics, a pinout (sometimes written "pin-out") is a cross-reference between the contacts, or pins, of an electrical connector or electronic component, and their functions. "Pinout" now supersedes the term "basing diagram" which was the standard terminology used by the manufacturers of vacuum tubes and the Radio Manufacturers Association (RMA). The RMA started its standardization in 1934, collecting and correlating tube data for registration at what was to become the Electronic Industries Alliance (EIA), which now has many sectors reporting to it and sets what is known as EIA standards where all registered pinouts and registered jacks can be found.

== Purpose ==
The functions of contacts in electrical connectors, be they power- or signaling-related, must be specified for connectors to be interchangeable. Each connector contact must mate with the contact on the other connector with the same function. If contacts of disparate functions are allowed to make contact, the connection may fail, and damage may result. Therefore, pinouts are a vital reference when building and testing connectors, cables, and adapters.

Suppose one has specified wires within a cable (for instance, the colored Ethernet cable wires in ANSI/TIA-568 T568A). In that case, the order in which different color wires are attached to pins of an electrical connector defines the wiring scheme. In any multi-pin connector, there are multiple ways to map wires to pins, so different configurations may be created that superficially look identical but function differently. Pinouts define these configurations. Many connectors have multiple standard pinouts in use for different manufacturers or applications.

== Terminology ==
While one usage of the word pin is to refer to electrical contacts of, specifically, the male gender, its usage in pinout does not imply gender: the contact-to-function cross-reference for a connector that has only female socket contacts is still called a pinout.

== Representation ==
The pinout can typically be shown as a table or diagram. However, it is necessary to clarify how to view the diagram, stating if it shows the backside of the connector (where wires are attached) or the "mating face" of the connector. Published pinouts, which are particularly important when different manufacturers want to interconnect their products using open standards, are typically provided by the connector or equipment manufacturer. However, some pinouts are provided by 3rd parties since the manufacturer does not well document some connectors.

While repairing electronic devices, an electronics technician uses electronic test equipment to "pin out" each component on a PCB. The technician probes each pin of the component in turn, comparing the expected signal on each pin to the actual signal on that pin.

== Example pinouts ==
=== USB pinout ===
Viewed from the front (outside) of Female Type A USB receptacle:

1. +5V (Red)
2. −Data (White)
3. +Data (Green)
4. GND (Black)

=== PS/2 pinout ===
PS/2 connector pinout

Pin number	Name	Purpose
1	DATA	Data
2		Not used
3	GND	Ground
4	Vcc	+5V Common-collector voltage
5	CLK	Clock signal
6		Not used

=== 4017 decade counter ===
4017 pinout

Pin number	Name	Purpose
1	Q5	The 6th sequential output
2	Q1	The 2nd sequential output
3	Q0	The 1st sequential output
4	Q2	The 3rd sequential output
5	Q6	The 7th sequential output
6	Q7	The 8th sequential output
7	Q3	The 4th sequential output
8	GND, V_{SS}	The connection to the 0 V rail
9	Q8	The 9th sequential output
10	Q4	The 5th sequential output
11	Q9	The 10th sequential output
12	CO	Carry out output - outputs high on counts 0 to 4, outputs low on counts 5 to 9 (thus a transition from low to high occurs when counting from 9 back to 0)
13	EN	Clock enable - inhibits the clock when high (i.e., the chip counts when EN is low)
14	CLK	Clock in
15	MR	Master Reset - sets outputs Q0 and CO high and outputs Q1 through Q9 low, when taken high
16	V_{DD}	The connection to the +V rail (voltage between +3 V and +18 V)

== See also ==
- Datasheet
- Piping and instrumentation diagram
- Circuit diagram
- Schematic
- 4000 series
- Crossover cable
