= Speedcabling =

Competitive sport

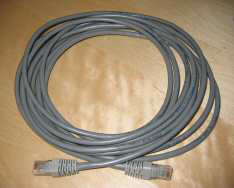
A Category 5 Ethernet cable.

Speedcabling is a competitive sport. Steven Schkolne devised the sport, which originated in the United States. In the standard rules, competitors are challenged to separate a mass of either six or twelve tangled Cat 5 Ethernet cables in the fastest possible time. Either two or four of each of red 7-foot, blue 14-foot, and yellow 21-foot cables are tangled. According to the regulations, the cables are tangled by forming a figure-eight and placing them in a clothes dryer on high heat for three minutes. They are then allowed to cool. Schkolne says this allows them to achieve a "natural" entanglement.

== First competition ==
The first speedcabling competition took place at the Machine Project art gallery in Los Angeles, California, which local web developer Matty Howell won. His prize was a $50 gift certificate for dinner at an Italian restaurant.
