= Crossover cable =

Cable with intentionally crossed wiring

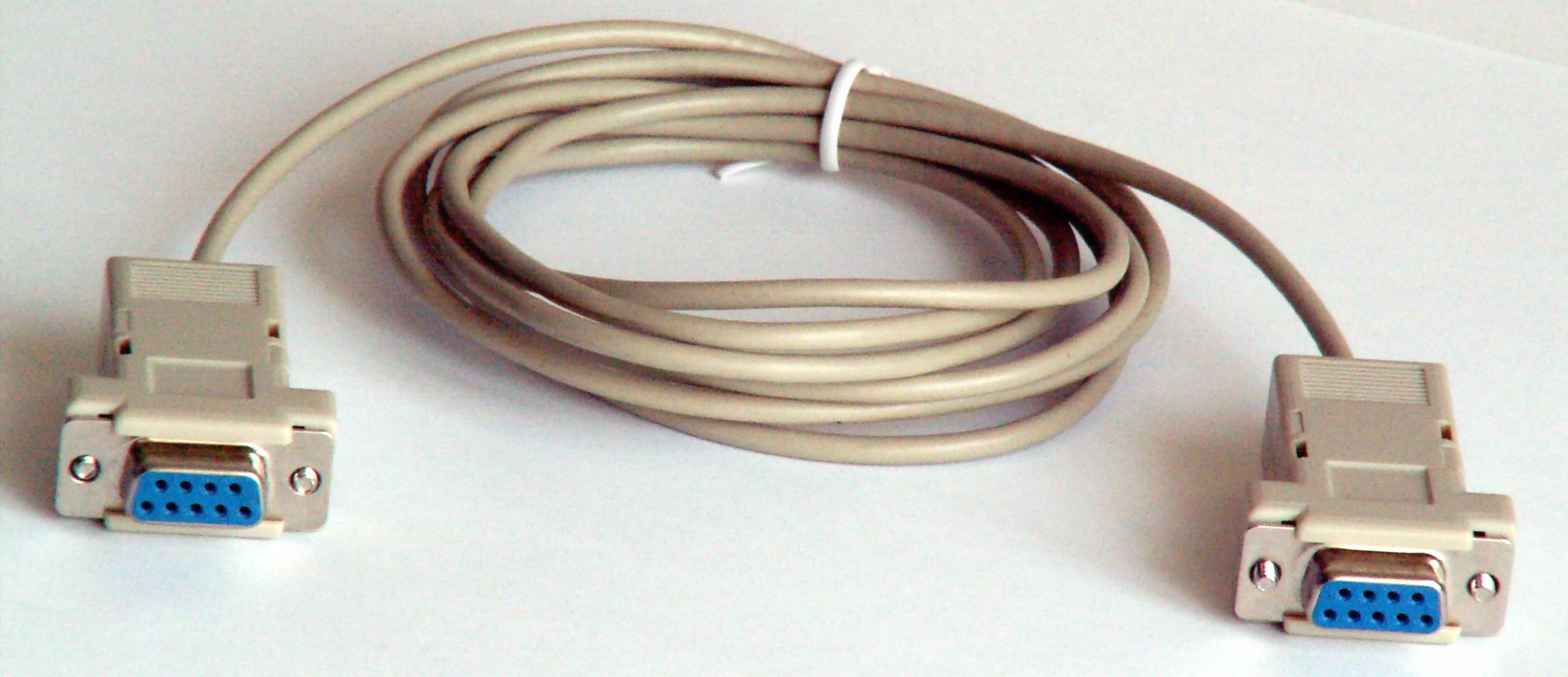
A null modem cable

A crossover cable connects two devices of the same type, for example DTE–DTE or DCE–DCE, usually connected asymmetrically (DTE–DCE), by a modified cable called a crosslink. Such a distinction between devices was introduced by IBM.

The crossing of wires in a cable or in a connector adaptor allows:

- connecting two devices directly, output of one to input of the other,
- letting two terminal (DTE) devices communicate without an interconnecting hub knot, i.e. PCs,
- linking two or more hubs, switches or routers (DCE) together, possibly to work as one wider device.

In contrast, a straight-through cable uses direct wiring to connect complementary devices, e.g. a PC to a switch.

== Concept ==
Straight-through cables are used for most applications, but crossover cables are required in others.

In a straight-through cable, pins on one end correspond exactly to the corresponding pins on the other end (pin 1 to pin 1, pin 2 to pin 2, etc.). Using the same wiring scheme at each end yields a straight-through cable (a given color wire connects to a given pin number, the same at both ends). In this case, the terminations are identical, so only one pinout is required.

In a crossover cable, pins do not correspond – some or all of the conductors are swapped at the terminations. For example, if pin 1 on one end goes to pin 2 on the other end, then pin 2 on one end goes to pin 1 on the other end, and the other pins remain unaffected. Such crossover cables are electrically symmetrical, meaning that they work identically regardless of which way you plug them in (if you turn the cable around, it still connects the same pins as before). Using different wiring at each end yields a crossover cable (a given color wire connects to one number pin at one end, and a different number pin at the other).

== Examples ==
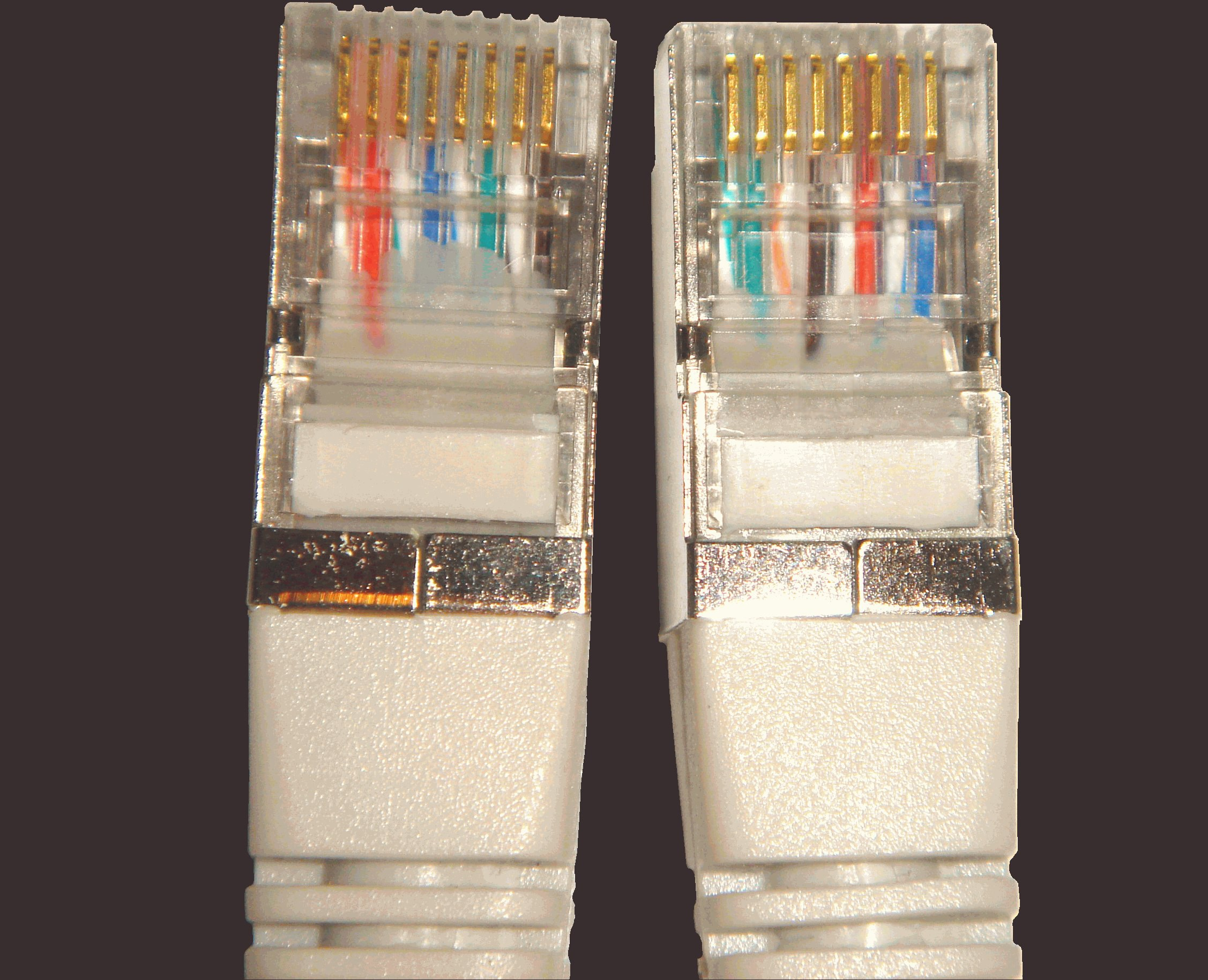
An Ethernet crossover cable

Cable requirement for Ethernet link
To From	MDI	MDI-X	Auto MDI-X
MDI	crossover	straight	any
MDI-X	straight	crossover	any
Auto MDI-X	any	any	any

- Null modem of RS-232
- Ethernet crossover cable
- Rollover cable
- A loopback is a type of degraded one-side crosslinked connection connecting a port to itself, usually for test purposes.

== Other technologies ==
Some connection standards use different balanced pairs to transmit data, so crossover cables for them have different configurations to swap the transmit and receive pairs:

- Twisted pair Token Ring uses T568B pairs 1 and 3 (the same as T568A pairs 1 and 2), so a crossover cable to connect two Token Ring interfaces must swap these pairs, connecting pins 4, 5, 3, and 6 to 3, 6, 4, and 5 respectively.
- A T1 cable uses T568B pairs 1 and 2, so to connect two T1 CSU/DSU devices back-to-back requires a crossover cable that swaps these pairs. Specifically, pins 1, 2, 4, and 5 are connected to 4, 5, 1, and 2, respectively.

Two pairs crossed, two pairs uncrossed T1 crossover
Pin	Connection 1: T568A		Connection 2: T568B		Pins on plug face
Pin	pair	color	pair	color	Pins on plug face
1	2	white/orange stripe	1	blue solid	
2	2	orange solid	1	white/blue stripe	
3	3	white/green stripe	3	white/green stripe	
4	1	blue solid	2	white/orange stripe	
5	1	white/blue stripe	2	orange solid	
6	3	green solid	3	green solid	
7	4	white/brown stripe	4	white/brown stripe	
8	4	brown solid	4	brown solid	

- A 56K DDS cable uses T568B pairs 2 and 4, so a crossover cable for these devices swaps those pairs (pins 1, 2, 7, and 8 are connected to 7, 8, 1, and 2, respectively).
- A standard USB-C to USB-C cable is technically a crossover cable, as the send and receive pairs for USB 3 are crossed over. The single-ended Sideband use signals are crossed over also, while the USB 2, CC and power lines are straight through.

== See also ==
- Electrical connector wiring
- Pinout
- Structured cabling
- ANSI/TIA-568
