= Telephone line =

Single-user circuit on a telephone communication system

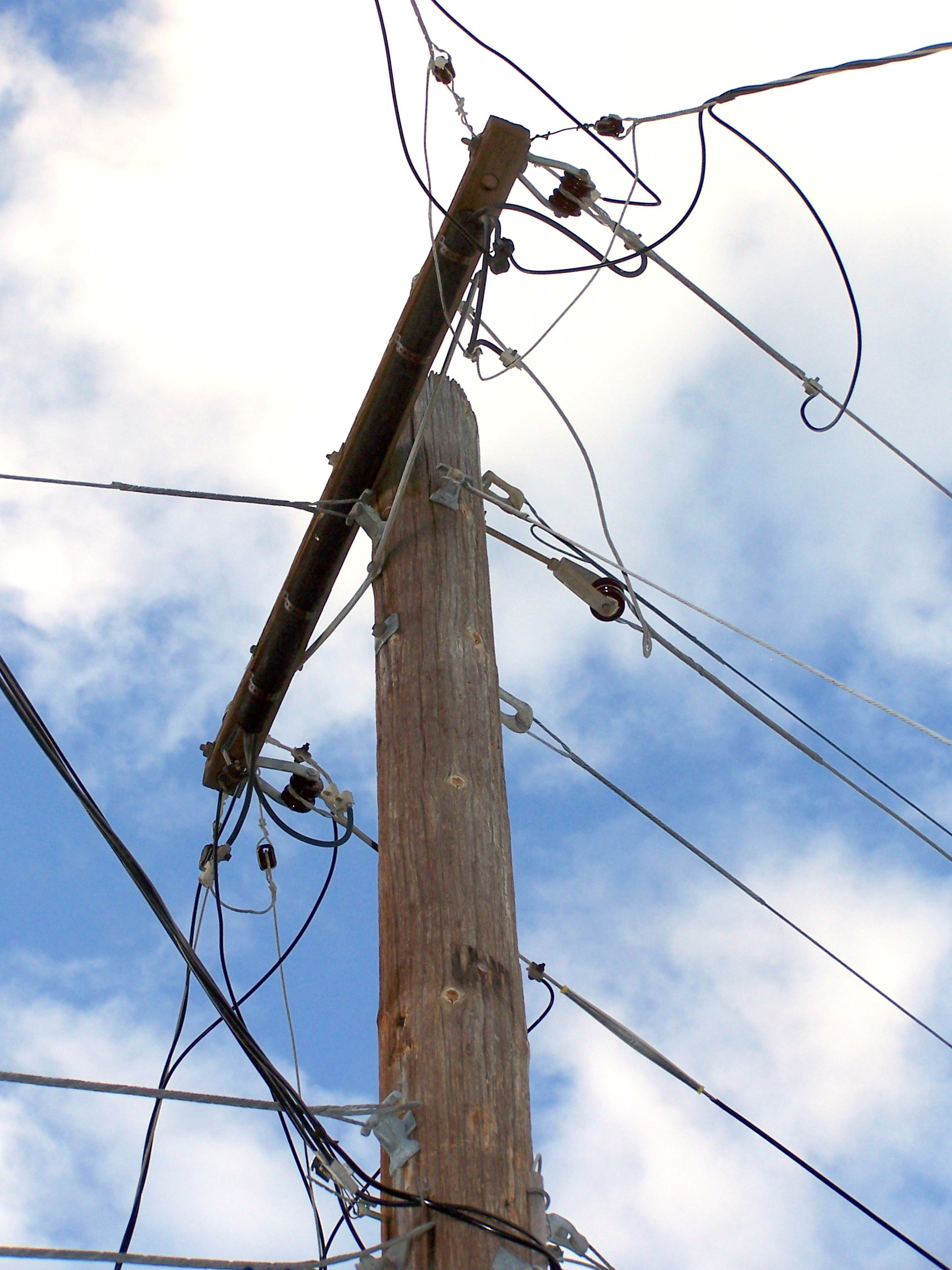
Utility pole with electric lines (top) and telephone cables.

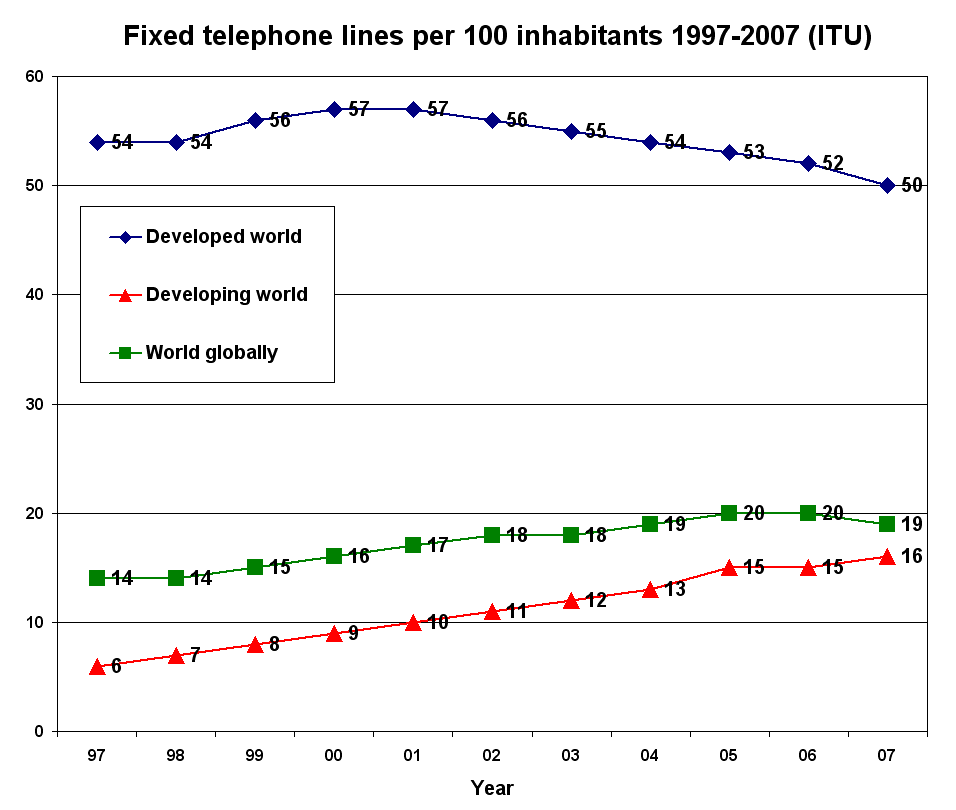
Fixed telephone lines per 100 inhabitants, 1997–2007.

Cross section of telephone cable of 1,800 twisted pairs, 1922.

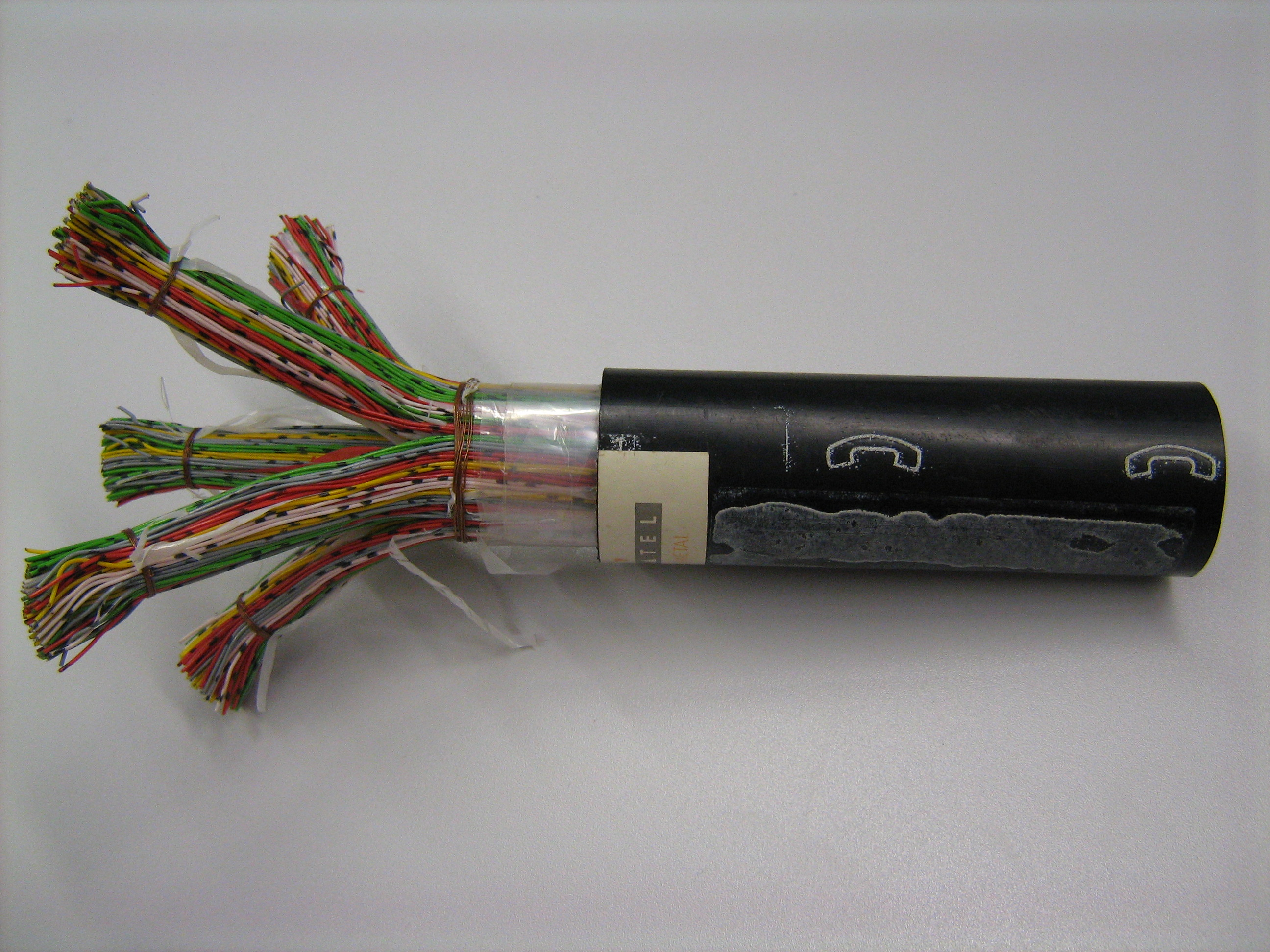
A newer telephone cable used to carry telephone lines from several customers

A telephone line or telephone circuit (or just line or circuit industrywide) is a single-user circuit on a telephone communication system. It is designed to reproduce speech of a quality that is understandable. It is the physical wire or other signaling medium connecting the user's telephone apparatus to the telecommunications network, and usually also implies a single telephone number for billing purposes reserved for that user.

Telephone lines are used to deliver consistent landline telephone service and digital subscriber line (DSL) phone cable service to the premises. Telephone overhead lines are connected to the public switched telephone network. The voltage at a subscriber's network interface is typically 48 V between the ring and tip wires, with tip near ground and ring at –48 V.

== In the United States ==
In 1878, the Bell Telephone Company began using two-wire circuits, called the local loop, from each user's telephone to end offices, which performed any necessary electrical switching to allow voice signals to be transmitted to more distant telephones.

These wires were typically copper, although aluminium has also been used, and were carried in balanced pairs of open wire, separated by about 25 cm (10″) on poles above the ground, and later as twisted pair cables. Modern lines may run underground and may carry analog or digital signals to the exchange. They may also have a device that converts the analog signal to digital for transmission on a carrier system. Often, the customer end of that wire pair is connected to a data access arrangement, and the telephone company end of that wire pair is connected to a telephone hybrid.

In most cases, two copper wires (tip and ring) for each telephone line run from a home or other small building to a local telephone exchange. There is a central junction box for the building where the wires that go to telephone jacks throughout the building and wires that go to the exchange meet and can be connected in different configurations depending upon the subscribed telephone service. The wires between the junction box and the exchange are known as the local loop, and the network of wires going to an exchange is known as the access network.

The vast majority of houses in the U.S. are wired with 6-position modular jacks with four conductors (6P4C) wired to the house's junction box with copper wires. Those copper wires may be connected back to two telephone overhead lines at the local telephone exchange, thus making those jacks RJ14 jacks. More often, only two of the wires are connected to the exchange as one telephone line, and the others are unconnected. In that case, the jacks in the house are RJ11.

Older houses often have 4-conductor telephone station cable in the walls color coded with Bell System colors: red, green, yellow, and black as 2-pairs of 22 AWG (0.33 mm^{2}) solid copper; "line 1" uses the red/green pair and "line 2" uses the yellow/black pair. Inside the walls of the house—between the house's outside junction box and the interior wall jacks—the most common telephone cable in new houses is Category 5 cable—4 pairs of 24 AWG (0.205 mm^{2}) solid copper.

Inside large buildings, and in the outdoor cables that run to the telephone company POP, many telephone lines are bundled together in a single cable using the 25-pair color code. Outside plant cables can have up to 3,600 or 3,800 pairs, used at the entrances of telephone exchanges.
