= Steven Schkolne =

American computer scientist, inventor and digital artist

- Born: 1976 (age 49–50); Cape Town, South Africa
- Education: California Institute of Technology; Carnegie Mellon University
- Occupations: Computer scientist; inventor; digital artist

Steven Schkolne (born 1976 in Cape Town, South Africa), inventor of speedcabling, is a South African American computer scientist, inventor, and digital artist.

== Biography ==
Schkolne was born in Cape Town and moved to the United States as a child. During high school he attended North Carolina School of Science and Mathematics. Later he earned his BS from Carnegie Mellon University. Schkolne went on to obtain his PhD in Computer Science at Caltech where he pioneered foundational methods for drawing in 3D or virtual reality environments.

== Surface drawing ==
Schkolne's graduate work at Caltech resulted in the first fully functional drawing program for virtual reality. The program, an early precursor to Google's Tilt Brush, was shown at SIGGRAPH in 1999. The program captured hand movements and translated them into digital strokes. Schkolne worked in collaboration with BMW's Designworks to use Surface Drawing as a platform for creating conceptual prototypes.
