= Ethernet crossover cable =

Cable wired to allow two similar devices to be directly connected

An Ethernet crossover cable is a crossover cable for Ethernet used to connect computing devices together directly. It is most often used to connect two devices of the same type, e.g. two computers (via their network interface controllers) or two switches to each other. By contrast, straight through patch cables are used to connect devices of different types, such as a computer to a network switch.

Intentionally crossed wiring in the crossover cable connects the transmit signals at one end to the receive signals at the other end.

Many network devices today support auto MDI-X (automatic crossover) capability, wherein a patch cable can be used in place of a crossover cable, or vice versa, and the receive and transmit signals are reconfigured automatically within the device to yield a working connection.

== Motivation ==
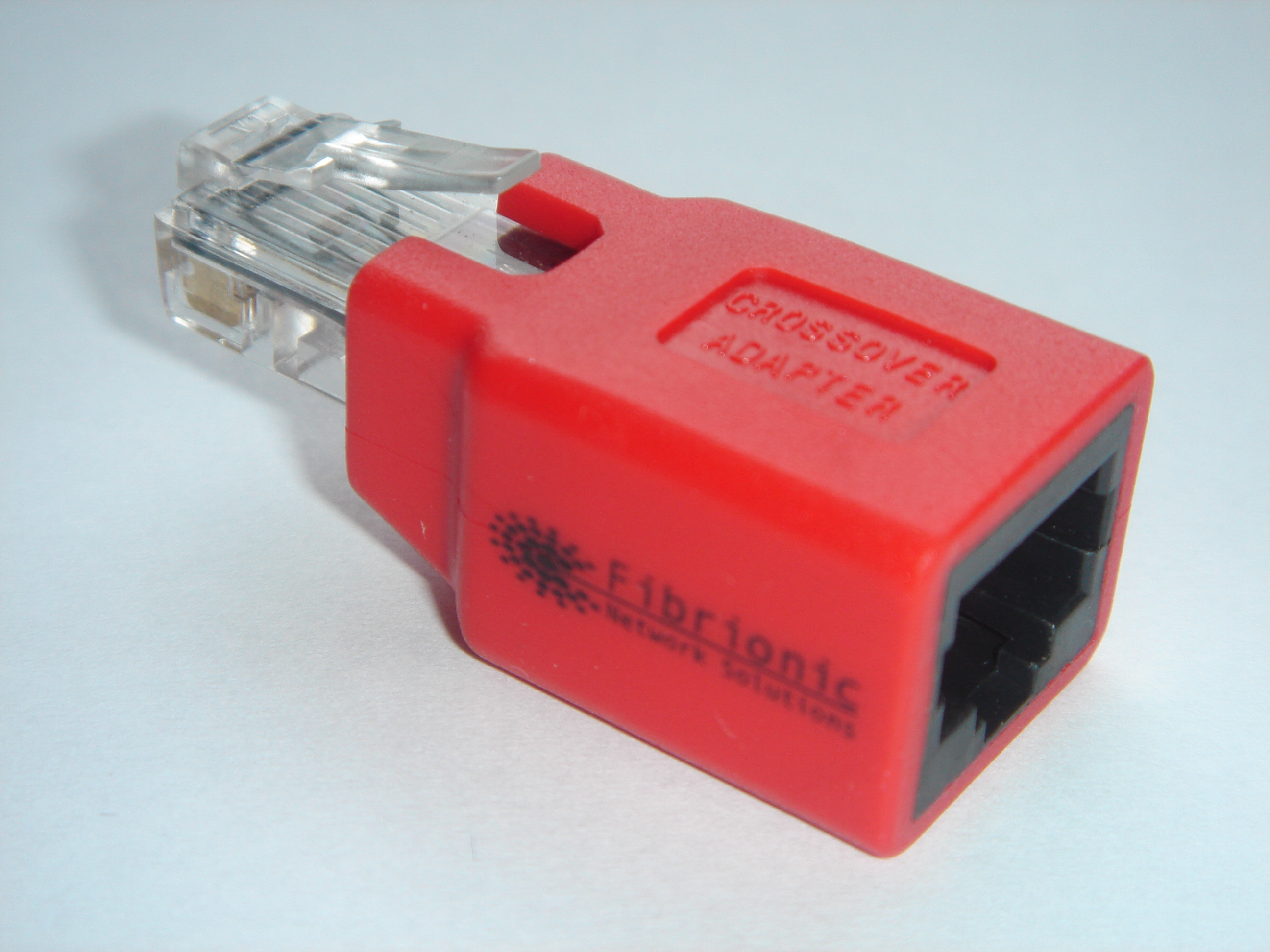
8P8C modular crossover adapter

The 10BASE-T and 100BASE-TX Ethernet standards use one wire pair for transmission in each direction. This requires that the transmit pair of each device be connected to the receive pair of the device on the other end. The 10BASE-T standard was devised to be used with existing twisted pair cable installations with straight-through connections.

When a terminal device (with an MDI port) is connected to a switch or hub, this crossover is done internally in the switch or hub (MDI-X port). A standard straight-through cable is used for this purpose, where each pin of the connector on one end is connected to the corresponding pin on the other connector.

One terminal may be connected directly to another without the use of a switch or hub, but in that case, the crossover must be done in the cabling. Since 10BASE-T and 100BASE-TX use pairs 2 and 3, these two pairs must be swapped in the cable. This wiring scheme constitutes a crossover cable. A crossover cable may also be used to connect two hubs or two switches on their upstream ports.

Because the only difference between the T568A and T568B pin and pair assignments are that pairs 2 and 3 are swapped, a crossover cable may be envisioned as a cable with one modular connector following T568A and the other T568B (see TIA/EIA-568 wiring). Such a cable will work for 10BASE-T or 100BASE-TX.

The polarity of each pair is not swapped, but the pairs crossed as a unit: the two wires within each pair are not crossed.

Cable requirement for Ethernet link
To From	MDI	MDI-X	Auto MDI-X
MDI	crossover	straight	any
MDI-X	straight	crossover	any
Auto MDI-X	any	any	any

== Automatic crossover ==
Introduced in 1998, this made the distinction between uplink and normal ports and manual selector switches on older hubs and switches obsolete. If one or both of two connected devices has the automatic MDI/MDI-X configuration feature, there is no need for crossover cables.

Although Auto MDI-X was specified as an optional feature in the 1000BASE-T standard, in practice, it is implemented widely on most interfaces.

Besides the eventually agreed upon Automatic MDI/MDI-X, this feature may also be referred to by various vendor-specific terms, including: Auto uplink and trade, Universal Cable Recognition and Auto Sensing.

== 1000BASE-T and faster ==
In a departure from both 10BASE-T and 100BASE-TX, 1000BASE-T and faster use all four cable pairs for simultaneous transmission in both directions through the use of telephone hybrid-like signal handling. For this reason, there are no dedicated transmit and receive pairs. 1000BASE-T and faster require either a straight or one of the crossover variants only for the autonegotiation phase. The physical medium attachment (PMA) sublayer provides identification of each pair and usually continues to work even over cable where the pairs are unusually swapped or crossed.

== Fiber ==
For most optical fiber variants of Ethernet, fibers are used in pairs, with one fiber for each direction. The transmitter on one end of the connection needs to be connected to the receiver on the other and vice versa. For this, fiber patch cables with duplex connectors are normally configured as crossover as is the on-premises wiring. Thus, a simple connection with two patch cables at each end and a section of fixed cable in the middle has three crossovers in total, resulting in a working connection. Patch cable crossovers can usually be reconfigured very easily by swapping the connectors within a duplex bracket if required.

== Pinouts ==
In practice, it does not matter if non-crossover Ethernet cables are wired as T568A or T568B, just so long as both ends follow the same wiring format. Typical commercially available pre-wired cables can follow either format, depending on the manufacturer. What this means is that one manufacturer's cables are wired one way and another's the other way, yet both are correct and will work. In either case, T568A or T568B, a normal (un-crossed) cable will have both ends wired identically according to the layout in either the Connection 1 column or the Connection 2 column.

=== Half crossed ===
Crossover cable connecting two MDI ports

Certain equipment or installations, including those in which phone and/or power are mixed with data in the same cable, may require that the non-data pairs 1 and 4 (pins 4, 5, 7 and 8) remain un-crossed. This is the most common kind of crossover cable.

Two pairs crossed, two pairs uncrossed 10BASE-T or 100BASE-TX crossover
Pin	Connection 1: T568A			Connection 2: T568B			Pins on plug face
Pin	signal	pair	color	signal	pair	color	Pins on plug face
1	BI_DA+	3	white/green stripe	BI_DB+	2	white/orange stripe	
2	BI_DA-	3	green solid	BI_DB-	2	orange solid	
3	BI_DB+	2	white/orange stripe	BI_DA+	3	white/green stripe	
4		1	blue solid		1	blue solid	
5		1	white/blue stripe		1	white/blue stripe	
6	BI_DB-	2	orange solid	BI_DA-	3	green solid	
7		4	white/brown stripe		4	white/brown stripe	
8		4	brown solid		4	brown solid	

=== Fully crossed ===
All pairs crossed While this is the only crossover for 1G, it also works for 10M and 100M Ethernet
Pin	TIA/EIA 568-A		TIA/EIA 568-B	
Pin	Normal	Crossover	Normal	Crossover
1	white/green stripe	white/orange stripe	white/orange stripe	white/green stripe
2	green solid	orange solid	orange solid	green solid
3	white/orange stripe	white/green stripe	white/green stripe	white/orange stripe
4	blue solid	white/brown stripe	blue solid	white/brown stripe
5	white/blue stripe	brown solid	white/blue stripe	brown solid
6	orange solid	green solid	green solid	orange solid
7	white/brown stripe	blue solid	white/brown stripe	blue solid
8	brown solid	white/blue stripe	brown solid	white/blue stripe

== See also ==
- Rollover cable
- Networking cable
- Null modem
