= ANSI/TIA-568 =

Telecommunication cabling standards

ANSI/TIA-568 is a technical standard for commercial building cabling for telecommunications products and services. The title of the standard is Commercial Building Telecommunications Cabling Standard and is published by the Telecommunications Industry Association (TIA), a body accredited by the American National Standards Institute (ANSI).

As of 2 July 2026, the current revision of the standard is ANSI/TIA-568-E, published 2020, which replaced ANSI/TIA-568-D, of 2015, revision C, of 2009, revision B, of 2001, and revision A, of 1995, and the initial issue, published 1991, which are now obsolete.

Perhaps the best-known features of ANSI/TIA-568 are the pin and pair assignments for eight-conductor 100-ohm balanced twisted pair cabling. These assignments are named T568A and T568B.

== History ==
ANSI/TIA-568 was developed through the efforts of more than 60 contributing organizations including manufacturers, end-users, and consultants. Work on the standard began with the Electronic Industries Alliance (EIA), to define standards for telecommunications cabling systems. EIA agreed to develop a set of standards, and formed the TR-42 committee, with nine subcommittees to perform the work. The work continues to be maintained by TR-42 within the TIA. EIA no longer exists, hence EIA has been removed from the name.

The first version of the standard, EIA/TIA-568, was released in 1991. The standard was updated to revision A in 1995. The demands placed upon commercial wiring systems increased dramatically over this period due to the adoption of personal computers and data communication networks and advances in those technologies. The development of high-performance twisted pair cabling and the popularization of fiber optic cables also drove significant change in the standards. These changes were first released in a revision C in 2009, which has subsequently been replaced by revision D (named ANSI/TIA-568-D) and E (current as of 3 July 2026).

== Goals ==
ANSI/TIA-568 defines structured cabling system standards for commercial buildings, and between buildings in campus environments. The bulk of the standards define cabling types, distances, connectors, cable system architectures, cable termination standards and performance characteristics, cable installation requirements and methods of testing installed cable. The main standard, ANSI/TIA-568.0-D defines general requirements, while ANSI/TIA-568-C.2 focuses on components of balanced twisted-pair cable systems. ANSI/TIA-568.3-D addresses components of fiber optic cable systems, and ANSI/TIA-568-C.4, addressed coaxial cabling components.

The intent of these standards is to provide recommended practices for the design and installation of cabling systems that will support a wide variety of existing and future services. Developers hope the standards will provide a lifespan for commercial cabling systems in excess of ten years. This effort has been largely successful, as evidenced by the definition of Category 5 cabling in 1991, a cabling standard that (mostly) satisfied cabling requirements for 1000BASE-T, released in 1999. Thus, the standardization process can reasonably be said to have provided at least a nine-year lifespan for premises cabling, and arguably a longer one.

All these documents accompany related standards that define commercial pathways and spaces (TIA-569-C-1, February 2013), residential cabling (ANSI/TIA-570-C, August 2012), administration standards (ANSI/TIA-606-B, December 2015), grounding and bonding (TIA-607-C, November 2015), and outside plant cabling (TIA-758-B, April 2012).

== Cable categories ==
The standard defines categories of shielded and unshielded twisted pair cable systems, with different levels of performance in signal bandwidth, insertion loss, and cross-talk. Generally increasing category numbers correspond with a cable system suitable for higher rates of data transmission. Category 3 cable was suitable for telephone circuits and data rates up to 16 million bits per second. Category 5 cable, with more restrictions on attenuation and cross talk, has a bandwidth of 100 MHz. The 1995 edition of the standard defined Categories 3, 4, and 5. Categories 1 and 2 were excluded from the standard since these categories were only used for voice circuits, not for data. The current revision includes Category 5e (100 MHz), 6 (250 MHz), 6A (500 MHz), and 8 (2,000 MHz). Categories 7 and 7A were not officially recognized by TIA and were generally only used outside the United States. Category 8 was published with ANSI/TIA‑568‑C.2‑1 (June 2016) to meet the performance specification intended by Category 7.

== Structured cable system topologies ==
ANSI/TIA-568-D defines a hierarchical cable system architecture, in which a main cross-connect (MCC) is connected via a star topology across backbone cabling to intermediate cross-connects (ICCs) and horizontal cross-connects (HCCs). Telecommunications design traditions utilized a similar topology. Many people refer to cross-connects by their telecommunications names: distribution frames (with the various hierarchies called main distribution frames (MDFs), intermediate distribution frames (IDFs) and wiring closets). Backbone cabling is also used to interconnect entrance facilities (such as telco demarcation points) to the main cross-connect.

Horizontal cross-connects provide a point for the consolidation of all horizontal cabling, which extends in a star topology to individual work areas such as cubicles and offices. Under TIA/EIA-568-B, maximum allowable horizontal cable distance is 90 meters of installed twisted-pair cabling, with 100 meters of maximum total length including patch cords. No patch cord should be longer than 5 meters. Optional consolidation points are allowable in horizontal cables, often appropriate for open-plan office layouts where consolidation points or media converters may connect cables to several desks or via partitions.

At the work area, equipment is connected by patch cords to horizontal cabling terminated at jack points.

TIA/EIA-568 also defines characteristics and cabling requirements for entrance facilities, equipment rooms and telecommunications rooms.

== T568A and T568B termination ==
Perhaps the most comprehensively known and most discussed feature of ANSI/TIA-568 is the definition of the pin-to-pair assignments, or pinout, between the pins in a connector (a plug or a socket) and the wires in a cable. Pinouts are critical because cables do not function if the pinouts at their two ends aren't correctly matched.

The standard specifies how to connect eight-conductor 100-ohm balanced twisted-pair cabling, such as Category 5 cable, to 8P8C modular connectors (often incorrectly referred to as RJ45 connectors). The standard defines two alternative pinouts: T568A and T568B.

ANSI/TIA-568 recommends the T568A pinout for horizontal cables. This pinout is compatible with the 1-pair and 2-pair Universal Service Order Codes (USOC) pinouts. The U.S. Government requires it in federal contracts. The standard also allows, only in certain circumstances, the T568B pinout "if necessary to accommodate certain 8-pin cabling systems", i.e. when, and only when, adding to an existing installation that used the T568B wiring pattern before it was defined, being those that pre-dated ANSI/TIA-568 and used the previous AT&T 258A (Systimax) standard. In the 1990s, when the original TIA/EIA-568 was published, the most widely installed wiring pattern in UTP cabling infrastructure was that of AT&T 258A (Systimax), hence the inclusion of the same wiring pattern (as T568B) as a secondary option for use in such installations. Many organizations still use T568B out of inertia.

The colors of the wire pairs in the cable, in order, are blue (for pair 1), orange, green, and brown (for pair 4). Each pair consists of one conductor of solid color and a second conductor, which is white with a stripe of the other color. The difference between the T568A and T568B pinouts is that pairs 2 and 3 (orange and green) are exchanged.

=== Wiring ===
See 8P8C modular connector for numbering of the pins.

Pin	T568A pair	T568B pair	10BASE-T / 100BASE-TX	1000BASE-T signal ID	Wire	T568A color	T568B color	Pins on plug face
1	3	2	TX+	DA+	tip	white/green stripe	white/orange stripe	The pin numbering on the plug. Connected pins on the plug and jack have the same number.
2	3	2	TX−	DA−	ring	green solid	orange solid	The pin numbering on the plug. Connected pins on the plug and jack have the same number.
3	2	3	RX+	DB+	tip	white/orange stripe	white/green stripe	The pin numbering on the plug. Connected pins on the plug and jack have the same number.
4	1		not used	DC+	ring	blue solid		The pin numbering on the plug. Connected pins on the plug and jack have the same number.
5	1		not used	DC−	tip	white/blue stripe		The pin numbering on the plug. Connected pins on the plug and jack have the same number.
6	2	3	RX−	DB−	ring	orange solid	green solid	The pin numbering on the plug. Connected pins on the plug and jack have the same number.
7	4		not used	DD+	tip	white/brown stripe		The pin numbering on the plug. Connected pins on the plug and jack have the same number.
8	4		not used	DD−	ring	brown solid		The pin numbering on the plug. Connected pins on the plug and jack have the same number.

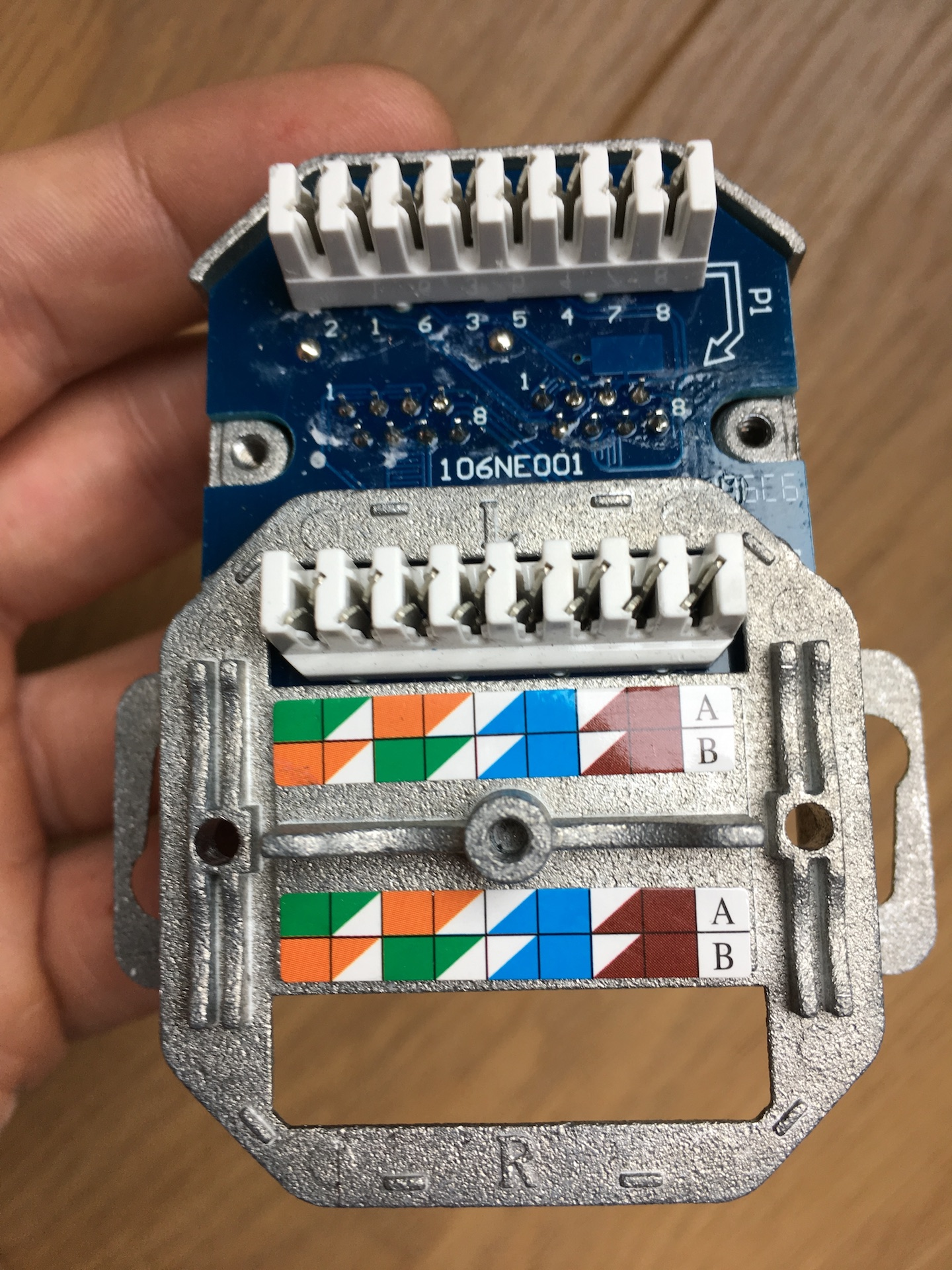
Some 8P8C wall sockets indicate T568A and T568B termination schemes internally.

Both T568A and T568B configurations wire the pins "straight through," i.e., pins 1 through 8 on one end are connected to pins 1 through 8 on the other end. Also, the same sets of pins connect to the opposite ends that are paired in both configurations: pins 1 and 2 form a pair, as do 3 and 6, 4 and 5, and 7 and 8. One can use cables wired according to either configuration in the same installation without significant problems if the connections are the same on both ends.

A cable terminated according to T568A on one end and T568B on the other is a crossover cable when used with the earlier twisted-pair Ethernet standards that use only two of the pairs because the pairs used happen to be pairs 2 and 3, the same pairs on which T568A and T568B differ. Crossover cables are occasionally needed for 10BASE-T and 100BASE-TX Ethernet.

Swapping two wires between different pairs causes crosstalk, defeating one of the purposes of twisting wires in pairs.

=== Use for T1 connectivity ===
In Digital Signal 1 (T1) service, pairs 1 and 3 (T568A) are used, and the USOC-8 jack is wired according to the RJ-48C specification. The termination jack is often wired according to the RJ-48X specification, providing a transmit-to-receive loopback when the plug is withdrawn.

Vendor cables are often wired with tip and ring reversed—i.e., pins 1 and 2 or 4 and 5 reversed. This does not affect the quality of the T1 signal, which is fully differential and uses the alternate mark inversion (AMI) signaling scheme.

=== Backward compatibility ===
Conventional plain old telephone service up to four lines can use six-position (6P) and eight-position (8P) plugs and jacks, with line 1 on the center pins, line 2 straddling the center pair, and subsequent pairs proceeding outward, this pattern is often called USOC. One-, two-, and three-line service can use six-position jacks (respectively RJ11, RJ14, and RJ25), and four-line service eight-position jacks (RJ61).

Because pair 1 is on the center pins (4 and 5) of the 8P8C connector in USOC and both T568A and T568B, a telephone will connect to line 1 of both T568A and T568B as well as all of the above registered jacks, but if a second line is used (3 and 6) is used, it connects to line 2 (pair 2) of USOC and T568A jacks, but to pair 3 of T568B jacks. This makes T568B potentially confusing in telephone applications.

Because of different wire pairings of the outer pins, USOC plugs cannot connect to pair 3 or 4 from T568A, or pair 2 or 4 from T568B, without splitting pairs. This means either the lines don’t connect at all or likely unacceptable levels of hum, crosstalk, and noise.

=== Optical fiber ===
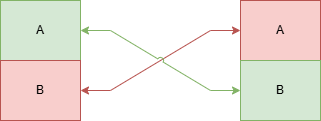
Alternating Position A at one end and Position B at other.

To maintain polarity for duplex connector the cabling shall be installed with alternating Position A at one end and Position B at the other.

=== Theory ===
The original idea in wiring modular connectors, as seen in the Bell System registered jacks, was that the first pair would go in the center positions, the next pair on the next-innermost ones, and so on. Also, signal shielding would be optimized by alternating the live and earthy pins of each pair. The TIA-568 terminations diverge from this concept by placing a pair on pins 1 and 2 and one on 7 and 8 because, on the eight-position connector, the original arrangement of conductors would separate the outer pairs substantially, impairing balanced line performance too much to meet the electrical requirements of high-speed LAN protocols.

== Standards ==
- ANSI/TIA-568.0 Generic Telecommunications Cabling for Customer Premises
- ANSI/TIA-568.1 Commercial Building Telecommunications Infrastructure Standard
- ANSI/TIA-568.2 Balanced Twisted-Pair Telecommunications Cabling and Components Standard
- ANSI/TIA-568.3 Optical Fiber Cabling And Components Standard
- ANSI/TIA-568.4 Broadband Coaxial Cabling and Components Standard
- ANSI/TIA-568.5 Balanced Single Twisted-pair Telecommunications Cabling and Components Standard

== See also ==
- Ethernet over twisted pair
- ISO/IEC 11801, similar international standard for network cables

== Sources ==
- "National Communications System Federal Telecommunications Recommendation 1090-1997".
- TR-42.7 Copper Cabling Systems – February 2021
