= Tip and ring =

Conductors of a telephone line

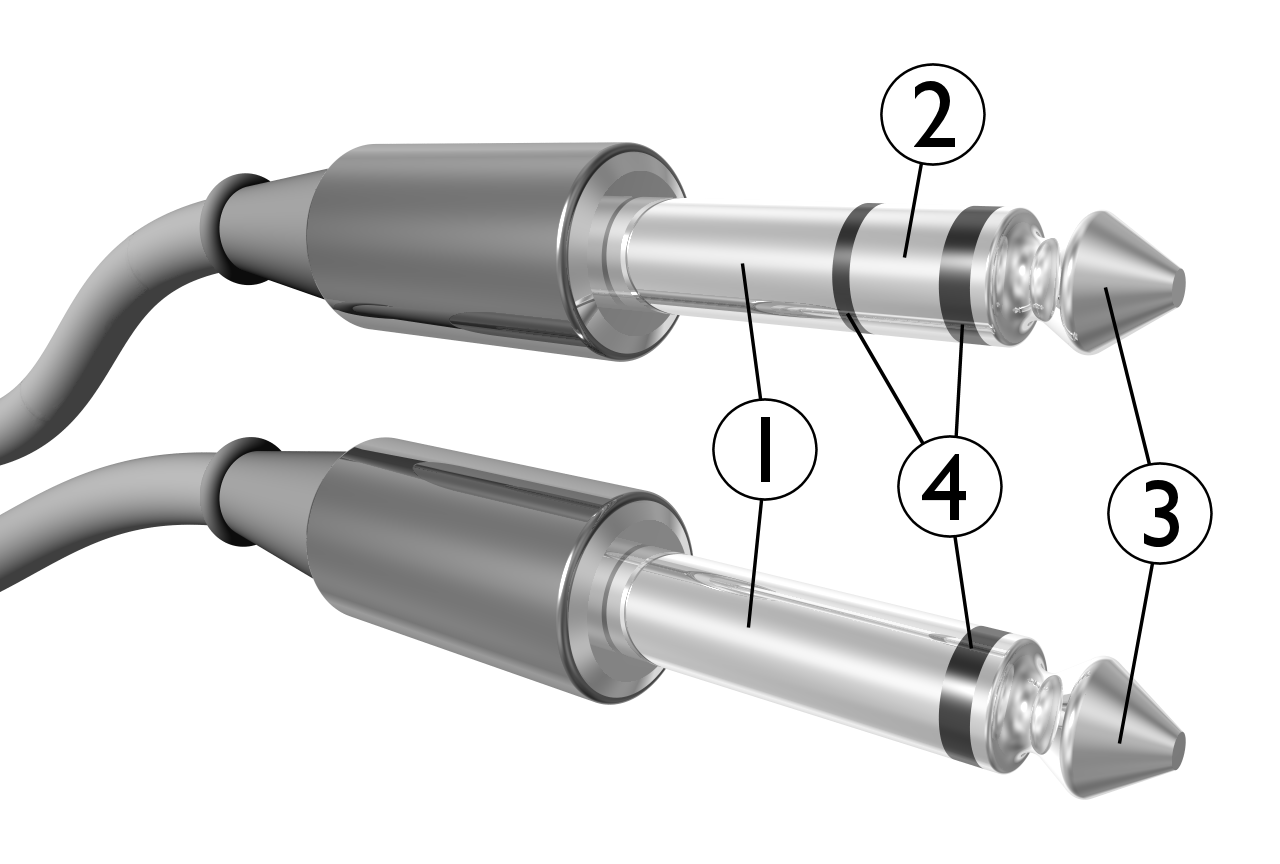
1: Sleeve, 2: Ring, 3: Tip, 4: Insulators

Tip and ring are the two conductors, or sides, of a telephone line. Their names are derived from the telephone plugs used for connecting telephone calls in manual switchboards. One side of the line is connected to the metal tip of the plug, and the second is connected to a metal ring behind the tip, separated and insulated from the tip by a non-conducting material. When inserted into a jack, the plug's tip conductor connects first, followed by the ring conductor. In many European countries, tip and ring are referred to as the A and B wires.

Neither of the conductors is permanently connected to earth, but one may be connected to earth during signaling operations. Typically, the ring conductor has a direct current (DC) potential of −48V to −52V with respect to the tip conductor when the line is in the on-hook (idle) state. Floating both conductors, i.e. not referencing either one to ground, minimizes the effect of interference from any nearby alternating current (AC) power wires.

== Origin ==
The terms tip and ring originated in the early days of telephony when telephone operators used plugs to connect customer calls. They are named after the parts of the plug to which the wires were connected. The words are often abbreviated as T and R.

== Line voltage ==
Telephone carriers provide DC potential (voltage) on telephone lines for the operation of analog telephone service at customer locations. This supply is referred to as battery owing to the history of achieving this with the use of electrochemical batteries. The potential supplied is a compromise between operational needs for reliable service and safety precautions for customers and service personnel. The length of the line to a customer telephone interface presents a resistance across which the central office supply is reduced and therefore the potential at customer sites varies. The nominal battery (system) voltage is 52.1 V, based on a 24-cell lead-acid battery. The voltage at a subscriber's network interface is typically 48 V between the ring and tip wires, with tip near ground (slightly negative relative to ground) and ring at −48 V relative to tip.

In the middle 20th century, long loops in many rural areas of North America used range extenders, which operated at 100 or 130 volts to ensure reliable signaling. Some rural switching systems were designed to apply range extenders internally and thus share a few extenders among many lines, while for other lines, one extender was applied externally per line.

To ring the telephone to alert a subscriber to an incoming call, the central office superimposes a 20 Hz AC signal, at a nominal voltage of 105 volts, over the DC voltage present on the idle line. Historically several multi-frequency systems have been used, however, for selective alerting of multiple subscribers connected to a party line, for which the A.C. voltage may be as high as 150 V.

== Polarity ==
To provide cathodic protection against corrosion of line wires, the operating potential of telephone lines is typically negative with respect to ground, and the tip side is generally close to the ground potential. Thus, all power supplies for telecommunication equipment are designated to supply a negative voltage.

In the era of the telephone industry when rotary dial instruments were in use, the polarity when connecting a telephone set to the tip and ring wires was usually important only for properly ringing a telephone, especially in party line service with selective ringing, and for correctly identifying the calling customer on certain party lines for toll calls.

When Touch-Tone service was introduced in the 1960s, the tone generator for DTMF required correct polarity as it depended on the line D.C. voltage for operation. Later Touch-Tone telephones included a diode bridge that eliminated the polarity sensitivity so that consumer telephone service is essentially immune to reversal today. However, some special circuits, such as some direct inward dialing (DID) trunks, T-1 lines, and ground start lines connected to field-side (terminal) equipment, e.g., a corporate private branch exchange (PBX) switch, correctly operate only with proper tip and ring polarity.

== Color code ==
In legacy on-premises wiring the first, or only, pair of inside wiring and jacks is color-coded in green for the tip conductor and red for the ring side. A second pair is coded in black for tip and yellow for ring. A third pair consists of white tip coding and blue ring coding. For larger cable assemblies more complex schemes, such as the 25-pair color code, are used.

Some telephone technicians used mnemonic phrases, such as red-right-ring-rear, or ring-right-red-rough, to remember that the red wire connects to the right-side post in the wall jack and to the ring on the plug and to the rear lug on main distribution frames. Sometimes rough or ridge was added for jumper wires with a tactile code.
