= Category 5 cable =

Unshielded twisted pair communications cable

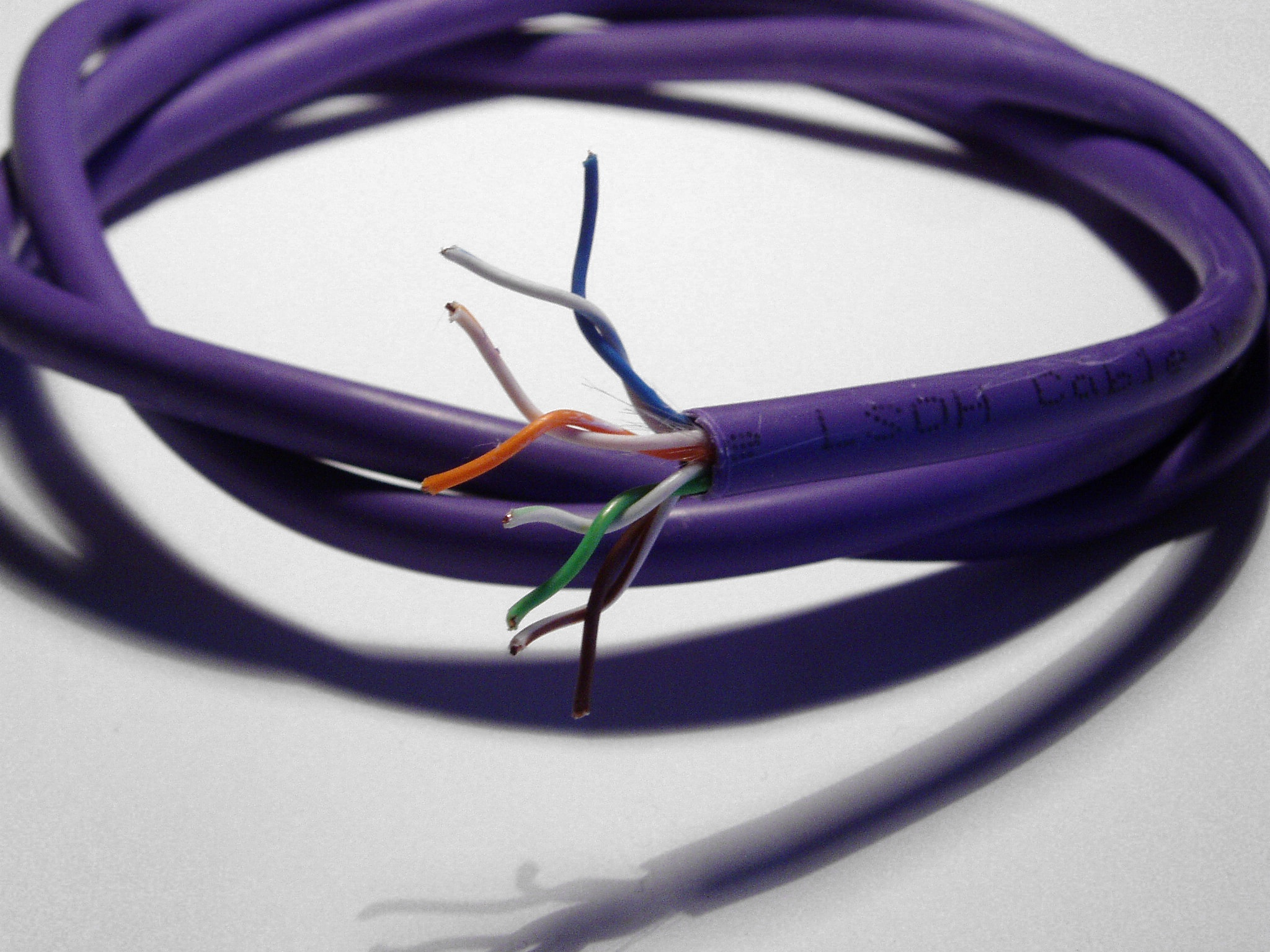
Category 5 cable that is partially stripped and showing its four twisted pairs (eight wires)

Category 5 cable (Cat 5) is a twisted pair cable for computer networks. Since 2001, the variant commonly in use is the Category 5e specification (Cat 5e). The cable standard provides performance of up to 100 MHz and is suitable for most varieties of Ethernet over twisted pair up to 10GBASE-T (Note: Up to 55 m on Cat 5e depending on the quality of installation) but more commonly runs at 1000BASE-T (Gigabit Ethernet) speeds. Cat 5 is also used to carry other signals such as telephone and video.

This cable is commonly connected using punch-down blocks and modular connectors. Most Category 5 cables are unshielded, relying on the balanced line twisted pair design and differential signaling for noise suppression.

== Standards ==
Category 5 is currently defined in ISO/IEC 11801, IEC 61156 and EN 50173, though it was originally defined in ANSI/TIA/EIA-568-A (with clarification in TSB-95). These documents specify performance characteristics and test requirements for frequencies up to 100 MHz.

The cable is available in both stranded and solid conductor forms. The stranded form is more flexible and withstands more bending without breaking. Patch cables are stranded. Permanent wiring used in structured cabling is solid. The category and type of cable can be identified by the printing on the jacket.

The Category 5 specification requires conductors to be pure copper. There has been a rise in counterfeit cables, especially of the copper-clad aluminum (CCA) variety. This has exposed the manufacturers and installers of such fake cable to legal liabilities.

== Variants and comparisons ==
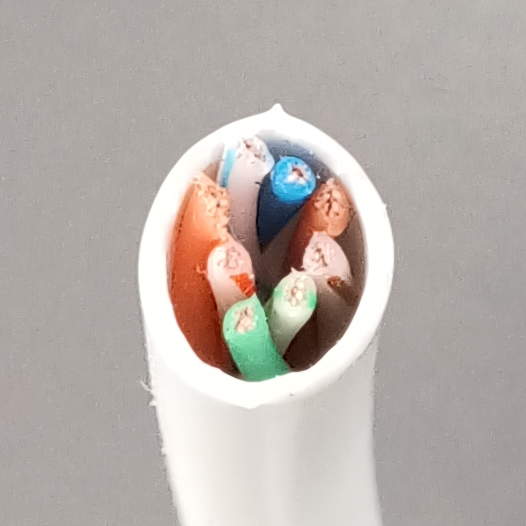
Cross section of a cat 5e cable

The Category 5e specification improves upon the Category 5 specification by further mitigating crosstalk. The bandwidth (100 MHz) and physical construction are the same between the two, and most Cat 5 cables actually happen to meet Cat 5e specifications even though they are not certified as such. Category 5 was deprecated in 2001 and superseded by the Category 5e specification.

The Category 6 specification improves upon the Category 5e specification by extending frequency response and further reducing crosstalk. The improved performance of Cat 6 provides 250 MHz bandwidth. Category 6A cable provides 500 MHz bandwidth. Both variants are backward compatible with Category 5 and 5e cables.

== Termination ==
ANSI/TIA-568 T568A Wiring
Pin	Pair	Wire	Color
1	3	1	white/green
2	3	2	green
3	2	1	white/orange
4	1	2	blue
5	1	1	white/blue
6	2	2	orange
7	4	1	white/brown
8	4	2	brown

ANSI/TIA-568 T568B Wiring
Pin	Pair	Wire	Color
1	2	1	white/orange
2	2	2	orange
3	3	1	white/green
4	1	2	blue
5	1	1	white/blue
6	3	2	green
7	4	1	white/brown
8	4	2	brown

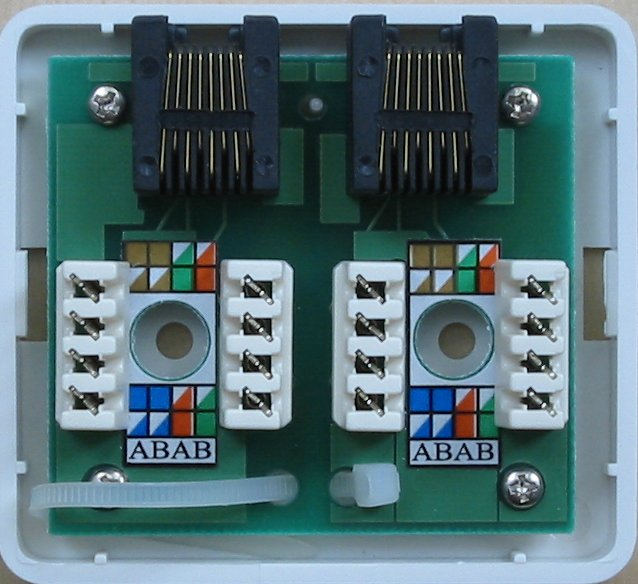
A Cat 5e dual-port wall-mount assembly showing the two wiring schemes: A for T568A, B for T568B

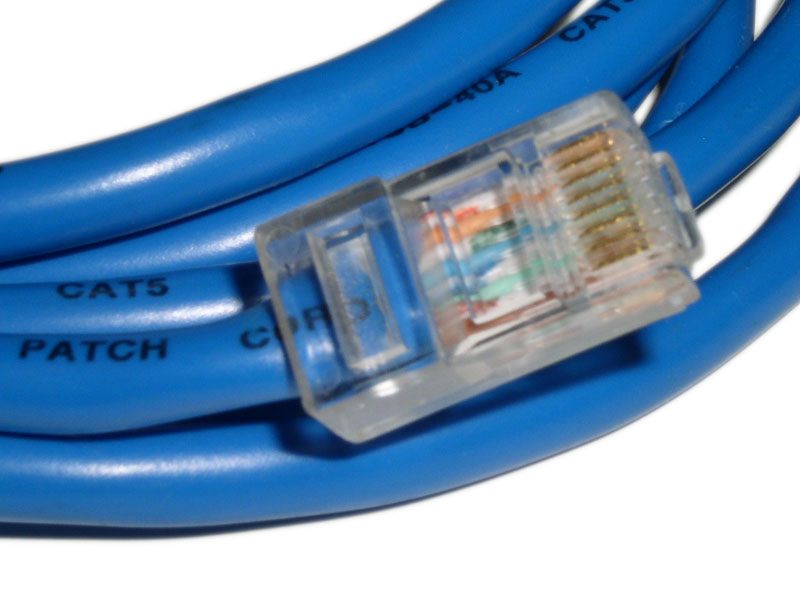
Category 5 patch cable in T568B wiring

Cable types, connector types and cabling topologies are defined by ANSI/TIA-568. Category 5 cable is nearly always terminated with 8P8C modular connectors (often referred to incorrectly as RJ45 connectors). The cable is terminated in either the T568A scheme or the T568B scheme. The two schemes work equally well and may be mixed in an installation so long as the same scheme is used on both ends of each cable.

== Applications ==
Category 5 cable is used in structured cabling for computer networks such as Ethernet over twisted pair. The cable standard prescribes performance parameters for frequencies up to 100 MHz and is suitable for 10BASE-T, 100BASE-TX (Fast Ethernet), 1000BASE-T (Gigabit Ethernet), 2.5GBASE-T and 10GBASE-T. 10BASE-T and 100BASE-TX Ethernet connections require two wire pairs. 1000BASE-T and faster Ethernet connections require four wire pairs. Through the use of power over Ethernet (PoE), power can be carried over the cable in addition to Ethernet data.

Cat 5 is also used to carry other signals such as telephony and video. In some cases, multiple signals can be carried on a single cable; Cat 5 can carry two conventional telephone lines as well as 100BASE-TX in a single cable. The USOC/RJ-61 wiring standard may be used in multi-line telephone connections. Various schemes exist for transporting both analog and digital video over the cable. HDBaseT (10.2 Gbit/s) is one such scheme.

== Characteristics ==
The use of balanced lines helps preserve a high signal-to-noise ratio despite interference from both external sources and crosstalk from other pairs.

Electrical characteristics for a commercially available Cat 5e UTP cable product
Property	Nominal	Tolerance	Unit	ref
Characteristic impedance, 1–100 MHz	100	± 15	Ω	
Characteristic impedance @ 100 MHz	100	± 5	Ω	
DC loop resistance	≤ 0.188		Ω/m	
Propagation speed relative to the speed of light	0.64			
Propagation delay	5.30		ns/m	
Delay skew < 100 MHz	< 0.20		ns/m	
Capacitance at 800 Hz	52		pF/m	
Max tensile load, during installation	100		N	
Wire diameter (24 AWG; 0.205 mm^{2}))	0.51		mm	
Operating temperature	−55 to +60		°C	
Maximum DC operating voltage (PoE uses max 57 V)	125		V	

=== Insulation ===
Outer insulation is typically polyvinyl chloride (PVC) or low smoke zero halogen (LS0H).

Example materials used as insulation in the cable
Acronym	Material
PE	Polyethylene
FP	Foamed polyethylene
FEP	Fluorinated ethylene propylene
FFEP	Foamed fluorinated ethylene propylene
AD/PE	Air dielectric/polyethylene
LSZH or LS0H	Low smoke, zero halogen
LSFZH or LSF0H	Low smoke and fume, zero halogen

=== Bending radius ===
Most Category 5 cables can be bent at any radius exceeding approximately four times the outside diameter of the cable.

=== Maximum cable segment length ===
The maximum length for a cable segment is 100 meters (330 ft) per TIA/EIA 568-5-A. If longer runs are required, the use of active hardware such as a repeater or switch is necessary. The specifications for 10BASE-T networking specify a 100-meter length between active devices. This allows for 90 meters of solid-core permanent wiring, two connectors and two stranded patch cables of 5 meters, one at each end.

=== Conductors ===
Since 1995, solid-conductor unshielded twisted pair (UTP) cables for backbone cabling have been required to be no thicker than 22 American Wire Gauge (AWG) and no thinner than 24 AWG, or 26 AWG for shorter-distance cabling. This standard has been retained with the 2009 revision of ANSI TIA/EIA 568.

Although cable assemblies containing four pairs are common, Category 5 is not limited to four pairs. Backbone applications involve using up to 100 pairs.

=== Individual twist lengths ===
The distance per twist is commonly referred to as pitch. Each of the four pairs in a Cat 5 cable has a differing pitch to minimize crosstalk between the pairs. The pitch of the twisted pairs is not specified in the standard.

=== Environmental ratings ===
United States and Canada fire certifications
Class	Phrase	Description	Standards
LSZH	Communications low-smoke zero halogen		NES‑711, NES‑713, MIL‑C‑24643, UL 1685
CMP	Communications plenum	Insulated with fluorinated ethylene propylene (FEP) and polyethylene (PE) and jacketed with low-smoke polyvinyl chloride (PVC), due to better flame test ratings.	CSA FT6 or NFPA 262 (UL 910)
CMR	Communications riser	Insulated with high-density polyolefin and jacketed with low-smoke polyvinyl chloride (PVC).	UL 1666
CMG	Communications general purpose		CSA FT4
CM	Communications	Insulated with high-density polyolefin, but not jacketed with PVC and therefore is the lowest of the three in flame resistance.	UL 1685 (UL 1581, Sec. 1160) Vertical-Tray
CMX	Communications residential		UL 1581, Sec. 1080 (VW-1)
CMH			CSA FT1

Some cables are UV-rated or UV-stable meaning they can be exposed to outdoor UV radiation without significant degradation.

Plenum-rated cables are slower to burn and produce less smoke than cables using a mantle of materials like PVC. Plenum-rated cables may be installed in plenum spaces where PVC is not allowed.

Shielded cables (FTP or STP) are useful for environments where proximity to RF equipment may introduce electromagnetic interference, and can also be used where eavesdropping likelihood should be minimized.
