= Registered jack =

Telecommunication network interface

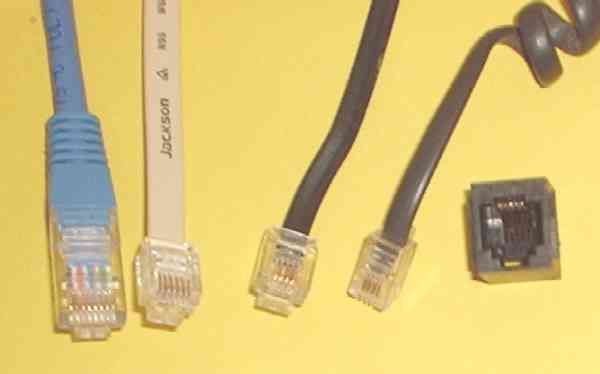
Modular connectors, left to right: Eight-position, eight-contact (8P8C) plug, as used for RJ45S, RJ49, RJ61, and others (though shown wired in a pattern incompatible with RJ61); Six-position, six-contact (6P6C) plug, which can be used with RJ25, RJ14, and RJ11; Six-position, four-contact (6P4C) plug, which can be used with RJ14 and RJ11 (and carries lines 1 and 2, but not line 3, of an RJ25); Four-position, four-contact (4P4C) plug, used for connecting a telephone handset and base; Six-position, six-contact (6P6C) jack, which may be wired as RJ11, RJ14, or RJ25

A Registered Jack (RJ) is a standardized telecommunication network interface for connecting voice and data equipment to a service provided by a local exchange carrier or long distance carrier. After their invention at Bell Labs by 1973, the standard was first defined in the Universal Service Ordering Code (USOC) system of the Bell System in the United States for complying with the registration program for customer-supplied telephone equipment mandated by the Federal Communications Commission (FCC). In 1980, they were codified in title 47 of the Code of Federal Regulations Part 68.

The specification includes physical construction, wiring, and signal semantics for numerous connection technologies. Accordingly, registered jacks are primarily named by the letters RJ, followed by two digits that express the type. Additional letter suffixes indicate minor variations. For example, RJ11, RJ14, and RJ25 are the most commonly used interfaces for telephone connections for one-, two-, and three-line service, respectively. Although these standards are legal definitions in the United States, some interfaces are used worldwide.

The connectors used for registered jack installations are primarily the modular connector and the 50-pin miniature ribbon connector. For example, RJ11 uses a six-position two-conductor connector (6P2C), RJ14 uses a six-position four-conductor (6P4C) modular jack, while RJ21 uses a 25-pair (50-pin) miniature ribbon connector.

== Naming standard ==
The registered jack designations originated in the standardization process of telephone connections in the Bell System in the United States, and describe application circuits and not just the physical geometry of the connectors. The same modular connector type may be used for different registered jack applications. Modular connectors were developed to replace older telephone installation methods that used hardwired cords or bulkier varieties of telephone plugs.

Strictly, Registered Jack refers to both the female physical connector (modular connector) and specific wiring patterns, but the term is often used loosely to refer to modular connectors regardless of wiring, gender, or use, commonly for telephone line connections, but also for Ethernet over twisted pair, resulting in confusion over the various connection standards and applications. For example, the six-position physical connector, plug and jack, is identically dimensioned and inter-connectable, whether it is wired for one, two, or three lines. These are the RJ11, RJ14, and RJ25 interfaces. The RJ standards designations only pertain to the wiring of the (female) jacks, hence the name Registered Jack. It is commonplace, but not strictly correct, to refer to the unwired connectors or the (male) plugs by these names.

The nomenclature for modular connectors is based on the number of contact positions and the number of contacts present. 6P indicates a six-position modular plug or jack. A six-position modular plug with conductors in only the middle two positions is designated 6P2C; 6P4C has four conductors in the middle positions, and 6P6C has all six. An RJ11 without power, if made with a 6P6C connector, has four unused contacts.

== History and authority ==
Registration interfaces were created by the Bell System under a Federal Communications Commission order for the standard interconnection between telephone company equipment and customer premises equipment. These interfaces used newly standardized jacks and plugs, primarily based on miniature modular connectors.

The wired communications provider (telephone company) is responsible for delivery of services to a minimum (or main) point of entry (MPOE). The MPOE is a utility box, usually containing surge protective circuitry, which connects the wiring on the customer's property to the communication provider's network. Customers are responsible for all jacks, wiring, and equipment on their side of the MPOE. The intent was to establish a universal standard for wiring and interfaces, and to separate ownership of in-home (or in-office) telephone wiring from the wiring owned by the service provider.

In the Bell System, following the Communications Act of 1934, the telephone companies owned all telecommunications equipment and they did not allow interconnection of third-party equipment. Telephones were generally hardwired, but may have been installed with Bell System connectors to permit portability. The legal case Hush-A-Phone v. United States (1956) and the Federal Communications Commission's (FCC) Carterfone (1968) decision brought changes to this policy, and required the Bell System to allow some interconnection, culminating in the development of registered interfaces using new types of miniature connectors.

Registered jacks replaced the use of protective couplers provided exclusively by the telephone company. The new modular connectors were much smaller and cheaper to produce than the earlier, bulkier connectors that were used in the Bell System since the 1930s. The Bell System issued specifications for the modular connectors and their wiring as Universal Service Order Codes (USOC), which were the only standards at the time. Large customers of telephone services commonly use the USOC to specify the interconnection type and, when necessary, pin assignments, when placing service orders with a network provider.

When the U.S. telephone industry was reformed to foster competition in the 1980s, the connection specifications became federal law, ordered by the FCC and codified in the Code of Federal Regulations (CFR), Title 47 CFR Part 68, Subpart F, superseded by T1.TR5-1999.

In January 2001, the FCC delegated responsibility for standardizing connections to the telephone network to a new private industry organization, the Administrative Council for Terminal Attachments (ACTA). For this delegation, the FCC removed Subpart F from the CFR and added Subpart G. The ACTA derives its recommendations for terminal attachments from the standards published by the engineering committees of the Telecommunications Industry Association (TIA). ACTA and TIA jointly published the standard TIA/EIA-IS-968, replacing the CFR information.

TIA-968-A, the current version of that standard, details the physical aspects of modular connectors, but not the wiring. Instead, TIA-968-A incorporates the standard T1.TR5-1999, "Network and Customer Installation Interface Connector Wiring Configuration Catalog", by reference. With the publication of TIA-968-B, the connector descriptions have been moved to TIA-1096-A. A registered jack name, such as RJ11, still identifies both the physical connectors and the wiring (pinout) for each application.

== Types ==
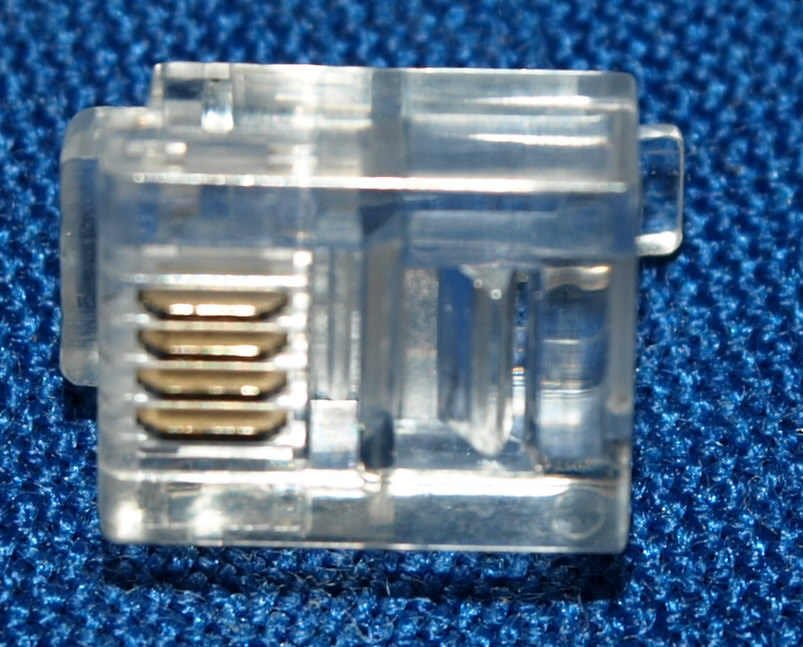
6P4C crimp-on style connector, commonly used for RJ11 and unpowered RJ14

The most widely implemented registered jack in telecommunications is the RJ11. This is a modular connector wired for one telephone line, using the center two contacts of six available positions. This configuration is also used for single-line telephones in many countries other than the United States. It may also use a 6P4C connector, to use an additional wire pair for powering lamps on the telephone set. RJ14 is similar to RJ11, but is wired for two lines and RJ25 has three lines. RJ61 is a similar registered jack for four lines, but uses an 8P8C connector.

The RJ45S jack is rarely used in telephone applications, and the keyed 8P8C modular plug used for RJ45S mechanically cannot be inserted into an Ethernet port, but a similar plug, the non-keyed 8P8C modular plug – never used for RJ45S – is used in Ethernet networks, and the connector is often, however improperly, referred to as RJ45 in this context.

Officially recognized types of registered jacks
| Code | Connector | Usage |
|---|---|---|
| RJA1X | 225A adapter | Connector for a modular plug to a four-prong jack |
| RJA2X | 267A adapter | Connector for splitting one modular jack to two modular jacks |
| RJA3X | 224A adapter | Connector for adapting a modular plug to a 12-prong jack |
| RJ2MB | 50-pin | 2–12 telephone lines with make-busy arrangement |
| RJ11(C/W) | 6P2C | Establishes a bridged connection for one telephone line (6P4C if power on second pair). In computers, it is often used for dial-up Internet access. |
| RJ12(C/W) | 6P6C | Establishes a bridged connection for one telephone line with key telephone system control ahead of line circuit |
| RJ13(C/W) | 6P4C | Similar to RJ12, but behind the line circuit |
| RJ14(C/W) | 6P4C | For two telephone lines (6P6C if power on third pair) |
| RJ15C | 3-pin weatherproof | For one telephone line for boats in marinas |
| RJ18(C/W) | 6P6C | For one telephone line with make-busy arrangement |
| RJ21X | 50-pin | Multiple (up to 25) line bridged T/R configuration |
| RJ25(C/W) | 6P6C | For three telephone lines |
| RJ26X | 50-pin | For multiple data lines, universal |
| RJ27X | 50-pin | For multiple data lines, programmed |
| RJ31X | 8P8C | Allows an alarm system to seize the telephone line to make an outgoing call during an alarm. The jack is placed closer to the network interface than all other equipment, and only four conductors are used. |
| RJ32X | 8P8C | Like RJ31X, this wiring provides a series tip and ring connection through the connecting block, but is used when the customer premises equipment is connected in series with a single station, such as an automatic dialer. |
| RJ33X | 8P8C | This wiring provides a series tip and ring connection of a KTS line ahead of the line circuit because the registered equipment requires CO/PBX ringing and a bridged connection of the A and A1 lead from behind the line circuit. Tip and ring are the only leads opened when the CPE plug is inserted. Typical usage is for customer-provided automatic dialers and call restrictors. |
| RJ34X | 8P8C | Similar to RJ33X, but all leads are connected behind the line circuit. |
| RJ35X | 8P8C | This arrangement provides a series tip and ring connection to whatever line has been selected in a key telephone set plus a bridged A and A1 lead. |
| RJ38X | 8P4C | Similar to RJ31X, with a continuity circuit. If the plug is disconnected from the jack, shorting bars allow the phone circuit to continue to the site phones. Only 4 conductors are used. |
| RJ41S | 8P8C, keyed | For one single-pair data line, universal (fixed loop loss and programmed) |
| RJ45S | 8P8C, keyed | For one single-pair data line, with programming resistor |
| RJ48C | 8P4C | For a four-wire data line (DSX-1) |
| RJ48S | 8P4C, keyed | For a four-wire data line (DDS) |
| RJ48X | 8P4C with shorting bar | For a four-wire data line (DS1) |
| RJ49C | 8P8C | For ISDN BRI via NT1 |
| RJ61X | 8P8C | For four telephone lines |
| RJ71C | 50-pin | 12-line series connection using 50-pin connector (with bridging adapter) ahead of customer equipment. Mostly used for call sequencer equipment. |

Many of the basic names have suffixes that indicate subtypes:

- C: flush-mount or surface mount
- F: flex-mount
- W: wall-mount
- L: lamp-mount
- S: single-line
- M: multi-line
- X: complex jack

For example, RJ11 comes in two forms: RJ11W is a jack from which a wall telephone can be hung, while RJ11C is a jack designed to have a cord plugged into it. A cord can be plugged into an RJ11W as well.

== RJ11, RJ14, RJ25 wiring ==
All of these registered jacks are described as containing a number of potential contact positions and the actual number of contacts installed within these positions. RJ11, RJ14, and RJ25 all use the same six-position modular connector, thus are physically identical except for the different number of contacts (two, four and six respectively) allowing connections for one, two, or three telephone lines respectively.

A cord connecting to an RJ11 interface requires a 6P2C connector. Nevertheless, cords sold as RJ11 often use 6P4C connectors (six position, four conductor) with four wires. Two of the six possible contact positions connect tip and ring, and the other two conductors are unused.

The conductors other than the two central tip and ring conductors are in practice variously used for a second or third telephone line, a ground for selective ringers, low-voltage power for a dial light, or for anti-tinkle circuitry to prevent pulse-dialing phones from sounding the bell on other extensions.

=== Pinout ===
The pins of the 6P6C connector are numbered 1 to 6, counting left to right when holding the cord entrance facing the viewer with the connector tab down.

| Position | Pair | T/R | ± | RJ11 | RJ14 | RJ25 | Twisted pair colors | 25-pair colors (Note: Established in the 1950s for polyethylene-insulated conductor (PIC) cable.Horn, F. W. (October 1958). "'Even-Count' Cable" (PDF). Bell Laboratories Record. 37 (5): 208–217.) | Old colors (Note: While the old solid color code was well established for pair 1 and usually pair 2, there are several conflicting conventions for pair 3 (and sometimes even pair 2). The colors shown above were taken from a vendor of silver satin flat 8-conductor phone cable that claims to be standard. 6-pair solid (old) bellwire cables previously used by the Bell System use white for pair 3 tip but some vendors' cable may substitute orange for white. At least one other vendor of flat 8-conductor cable uses the sequence blue, orange, black, red, green, yellow, brown and white/slate.) | German colors (Note: This color scheme originates in the (withdrawn) national standard DIN 47100. The scheme shown here is the correct color code for interfacing with the RJ connector standards.) | Australian colors | Dutch colors | Diagram |
|---|---|---|---|---|---|---|---|---|---|---|---|---|---|
| 1 | 3 | T | + | | | T3 | white/green | white/green | white | pink | orange | | 6P6C connector showing the location of pin 1 |
| 2 | 2 | T | + | | T2 | T2 | white/orange | white/orange | black | green | red | orange | 6P6C connector showing the location of pin 1 |
| 3 | 1 | R | − | R1 | R1 | R1 | blue | blue/white | red | white | blue | red | 6P6C connector showing the location of pin 1 |
| 4 | 1 | T | + | T1 | T1 | T1 | white/blue | white/blue | green | brown | white | blue | 6P6C connector showing the location of pin 1 |
| 5 | 2 | R | − | | R2 | R2 | orange | orange/white | yellow | yellow | black | white | 6P6C connector showing the location of pin 1 |
| 6 | 3 | R | − | | | R3 | green | green/white | blue | gray | green | | 6P6C connector showing the location of pin 1 |

=== Provisioning of power ===
Some telephones such as the Western Electric Princess and Trimline telephone models require additional power (~6 V AC) for operation of the incandescent dial light. This power is delivered to the telephone set from a transformer by the second wire pair (pins 2 and 5) of the 6P4C connector.

== RJ21 ==
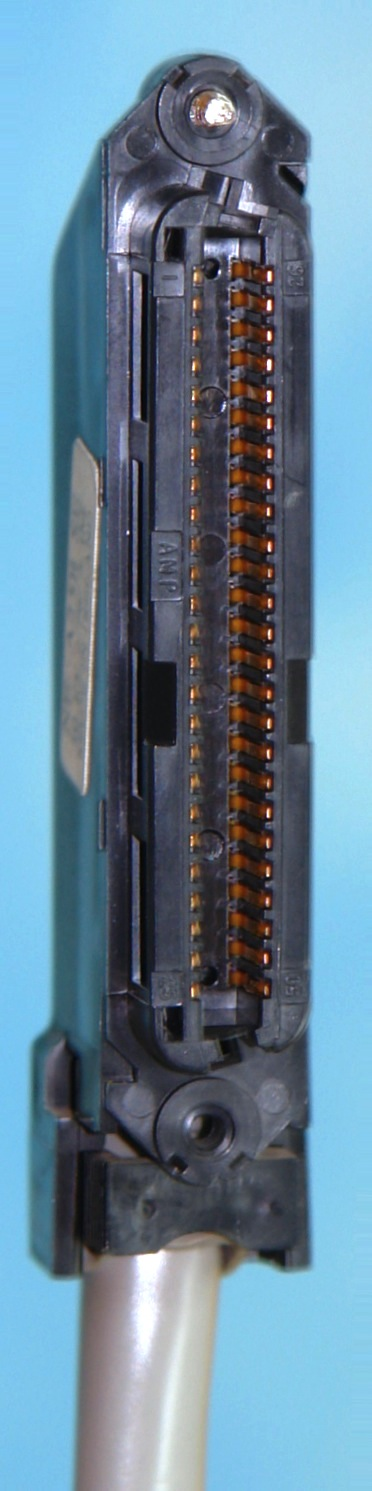
Female RJ21 connector. Pin assignment is coordinated with the table.

Even-count color code
| Color | Pin (tip) | Pin (ring) | Color |
|---|---|---|---|
| White/blue | 26 | 1 | Blue/white |
| White/orange | 27 | 2 | Orange/white |
| White/green | 28 | 3 | Green/white |
| White/brown | 29 | 4 | Brown/white |
| White/slate | 30 | 5 | Slate/white |
| Red/blue | 31 | 6 | Blue/red |
| Red/orange | 32 | 7 | Orange/red |
| Red/green | 33 | 8 | Green/red |
| Red/brown | 34 | 9 | Brown/red |
| Red/slate | 35 | 10 | Slate/red |
| Black/blue | 36 | 11 | Blue/black |
| Black/orange | 37 | 12 | Orange/black |
| Black/green | 38 | 13 | Green/black |
| Black/brown | 39 | 14 | Brown/black |
| Black/slate | 40 | 15 | Slate/black |
| Yellow/blue | 41 | 16 | Blue/yellow |
| Yellow/orange | 42 | 17 | Orange/yellow |
| Yellow/green | 43 | 18 | Green/yellow |
| Yellow/brown | 44 | 19 | Brown/yellow |
| Yellow/slate | 45 | 20 | Slate/yellow |
| Violet/blue | 46 | 21 | Blue/violet |
| Violet/orange | 47 | 22 | Orange/violet |
| Violet/green | 48 | 23 | Green/violet |
| Violet/brown | 49 | 24 | Brown/violet |
| Violet/slate | 50 | 25 | Slate/violet |

RJ21 is a registered jack standard using a micro ribbon connector with contacts for up to fifty conductors. It is used to implement connections for up to 25 lines, or circuits that require many wire pairs, such as used in the 1A2 key telephone system. The miniature ribbon connector of this interface is also known as a 50-pin telco connector, CHAMP(AMP), or Amphenol connector, the last being a genericized trademark, as Amphenol was a prominent manufacturer of these at one time.

A cable color scheme, known as even-count color code, is determined for 25 pairs of conductors as follows: For each ring, the primary, more prominent color is chosen from the set blue, orange, green, brown, and slate, in that order, and the secondary, thinner stripe color from the set white, red, black, yellow, and violet, in that order. The tip conductor color scheme uses the same colors as the matching ring but switches the thickness of the primary and secondary colored stripes. Since the sets are ordered, an orange (color 2 in its set) with a yellow (color 4) is the color scheme for the 4 × 5 + 2 − 5 = 17th pair of wires. If the yellow is the more prominent, thicker stripe, then the wire is a tip conductor connecting to the pin numbered 25 + the pair #, which is pin 42 in this case. Ring conductors connect to the same pin number as the pair number.

A conventional enumeration of wire color pairs then begins blue (and white), orange (and white), green (and white) and brown (and white), which subsumes a color-coding convention used in cables of four or fewer pairs (eight wires or less) with 8P and 6P connectors.

Dual 50-pin ribbon connectors are often used on punch blocks to create a breakout box for private branch exchange (PBX) and other key telephone systems.

== RJ45S ==
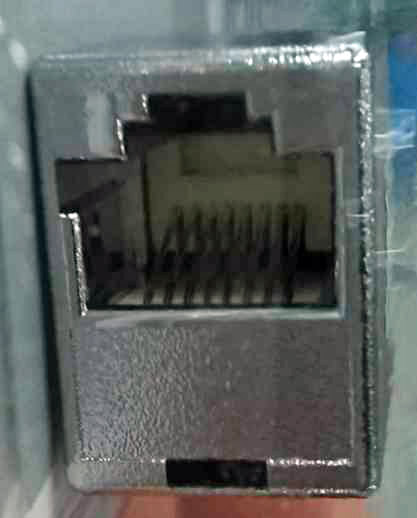
8P8C keyed female connector (jack), the same as that used in RJ45S

The RJ45S, an obsolete standard jack once specified for modem or data interfaces, has a slot on one side to allow mating with a special variation of the 8P plug: a mechanically-keyed plug with an extra tab on one side that prevents it from mating with regular (non-keyed) 8P jacks. The visual difference from the more-common 8P female is subtle. The RJ45S keyed 8P modular connector has only pins 5 and 4 wired for tip and ring (respectively) of a single telephone line, and a "programming" resistor connected to pins 7 and 8.

== RJ48 ==
RJ48C and RJ48X wiring
| Pin | Pair | Signal | Color |
|---|---|---|---|
| 1 | R | RX ring | Orange/white |
| 2 | T | RX tip | White/orange |
| 3 | | Reserved | White/green |
| 4 | R1 | TX ring | Blue/white |
| 5 | T1 | TX tip | White/blue |
| 6 | | Reserved | Green/white |
| 7 | | Shield | White/brown |
| 8 | | Shield | Brown/white |

RJ48 is used for T1 and ISDN termination, local-area data channels, and subrate digital services. It uses the eight-position modular connector (8P8C).

RJ48C is commonly used for T1 circuits and uses pin numbers 1, 2, 4 and 5.

RJ48X is a variation that contains shorting blocks in the jack for troubleshooting: With no plug inserted, pins 2 and 5 (the two tip wires) are connected to each other, and likewise 1 and 4 (ring), creating a loopback so that a signal received on one pair is returned on the other. Sometimes this is referred to as a self-looping jack.

RJ48S is typically used for local-area data channels and subrate digital services and carries one line. It accepts a keyed variety of the 8P modular connector.

RJ48 connectors are fastened to shielded twisted pair (STP) cables, not the unshielded twisted-pair (UTP) commonly used in other installations.

== RJ61 ==
RJ61 wiring (USOC)
| Pin | Pair | Signal | Color |
|---|---|---|---|
| 1 | 4 | Tip | White/brown |
| 2 | 3 | Tip | White/green |
| 3 | 2 | Tip | White/orange |
| 4 | 1 | Ring | Blue/white |
| 5 | 1 | Tip | White/blue |
| 6 | 2 | Ring | Orange/white |
| 7 | 3 | Ring | Green/white |
| 8 | 4 | Ring | Brown/white |

RJ61 is a physical interface that was often used for terminating twisted pair cables. It uses an eight-position, eight-conductor (8P8C) modular connector.

This wiring pattern is for multi-line analog telephone use only; RJ61 is unsuitable for use with high-speed data because the pins for pairs 3 and 4 are too widely spaced for high signaling frequencies. T1 lines use another wiring for the same connector, designated RJ48. Ethernet over twisted pair (10BASE-T, 100BASE-TX and 1000BASE-T) also uses different wiring for the same connector, either T568A or T568B. RJ48, T568A, and T568B are all designed to keep both wires of each pair close together.

The flat eight-conductor silver-satin cable conventionally used with four-line analog telephones and RJ61 jacks is also unsuitable for use with high-speed data. Twisted pair cabling is required for data applications. Twisted-pair patch cable typically used with common Ethernet and other data network standards is not compatible with RJ61, because RJ61 pairs 3 and 4 would each be split across two different twisted pairs in the patch cable, causing excessive cross-talk between voice lines 3 and 4, with conversations on each line literally being audible on the other.

With the advent of structured wiring systems and TIA/EIA-568 (now ANSI/TIA-568) conventions, the RJ61 wiring pattern is falling into disuse. The T568A and T568B standards are used in place of RJ61 so that a single wiring standard in a facility can be used for both voice and data.

== Similar jacks and unofficial names ==
The following RJ-style names do not refer to official ACTA types.

The labels RJ9, RJ10, RJ22 are variously used for 4P4C and 4P2C modular connectors, most typically installed on telephone handsets and their cordage. Telephone handsets do not connect directly to the public network, and therefore have no registered jack designation.

RJ11 generally uses 6P2C, but can also be 6P4C if powered.

RJ45 is often incorrectly used when referring to an 8P8C connector used for ANSI/TIA-568 T568A and T568B and Ethernet. The connector commonly used for twisted-pair Ethernet is a non-keyed 8P8C connector, quite distinct from that used for RJ45S. The plug used for RJ45S is both mechanically and electrically incompatible with any Ethernet port: it cannot fit into an Ethernet port, and it is wired in a way that is incompatible with Ethernet. The new ARJ45 interface, however, is a plug and jack allowing higher transmission rates, and the jack can, optionally, be backward-compatible with the common 8P8C plugs of Gigabit Ethernet and earlier standards.

RJ50 is often a 10P10C interface, often used for data applications.

The micro ribbon connector, first made by Amphenol, that is used in the RJ21 interface, has also been used to connect Ethernet ports in bulk from a switch with 50-pin ports to a Cat-5 rated patch panel, or between two patch panels. A cable with a 50-pin connector on one end can support six fully wired 8P8C connectors or Ethernet ports on a patch panel with one spare pair. Alternatively, only the necessary pairs for 10/100 Ethernet can be wired allowing twelve Ethernet ports with a single spare pair.

This connector is also used with spring bail locks for SCSI-1 connections. Some computer printers use a shorter 36-pin version known as a Centronics connector.

The 8P8C modular jack was chosen as a candidate for ISDN systems. In order to be considered, the connector system had to be defined by an international standard, leading to the creation of the ISO 8877 standard. Under the rules of the IEEE 802 standards project, international standards are to be preferred over national standards, so when the original 10BASE-T twisted-pair wiring version of Ethernet was developed, this modular connector was chosen as the basis for IEEE 802.3i-1990.

== See also ==
- Audio and video interfaces and connectors – generic article
- BS 6312 – British equivalent to RJ25
- EtherCON – ruggedized 8P8C Ethernet connector
- Key telephone system
- Modified Modular Jack – a variation used by Digital Equipment Corporation for serial computer connections, and also for CEA-909 antennas.
- Protea (telephone) – South African telephone jack standard
- Telecommunications Industry Association – Standards Developing Organization for ACTA
