= List of telephony terminology =

This is a list of telephony terminology and acronyms which relate to telephony networks.

== A ==
- Advanced Intelligent Network, (AIN), see also IN or Intelligent Network
- Automatic number announcement circuit (ANAC)
- Automated Attendant
- ACD - Automatic Call Distribution
- Articulation score

== B ==
- Blue box - a device that was used to bypass the normal long-distance call switching tones typically used to obtain free calls.

== C ==
- Call originator - (or calling party, caller or A-party) a person or device that initiates a telephone call by dialling a telephone number.
- Call waiting - a system that notifies a caller of another incoming telephone call by sounding a sound in the earpiece.
- Called party - (or callee or B-party)
- Caller
- Calling party
- Conference call (multi-party call)
- COCOT
- Cut – unexpected, and usually sudden, termination of call, line or service

== D ==
- Dial peer
- Dial tone
- Distribution frame
- Dual-tone multi-frequency signaling (DTMF)

== E ==
- Emergency telephone number
- End instrument
- Engset calculation
- Erlang unit

== F ==
- Fax - (contraction of facsimile) a device connected to the telephone network to enable documents to be scanned and sent to a receiving fax machine
- Frame - A distribution frame, a set of open wiring racks where circuits are cross connected to trunks and equipment

== H ==
- Handoff
- Handover
- Help desk
- Howler tone (see ROH tone)
- Hunt Group

== I ==
- Infrastructure
- Intelligent Network (IN)
- Interface functionality
- Inside plant
- Intelligent Network Interface Device (iNID) - replaces the Network Interface Device outside a subscriber's house like when customers subscribe to AT&T's U-verse brand of services.
- Interactive voice response (IVR)
- ISDN User Part (ISUP)

== L ==
- Line
- Local loop
- Long-distance operator

== O ==
- On-premises wiring
- Operator assistance
- Outside plant

== P ==
- PAM - Pulse Amplitude Modulation used to convert an analog signal to digital representation of the analog signal in each channel of a "D" Type carrier system
- PCM - Pulse Code Modulation is a modulation scheme used to transmit digital binary data in a T1 system
- Permanent signal
- Person-to-person
- Plain old telephone service, or "POTS"
- Public Switched Telephone Network (PSTN)
- Pupinization

== R ==
- Receiver Off-Hook tone (ROH)
- Red telephone box
- Red box
- Regional Bell Operating Company (RBOC)
- Ringer equivalency number (REN)
- Ringing signal
- Rural radio service

== S ==
- Smartphone
- Station-to-station
- Signalling System 7 (SS7)

== T ==
- Tandem signaling
- Tandem switch
- Transaction Capabilities Application Part (TCAP)
- Telemarketing
- Telephone
- Telephone booth
- Telephone call
- Telephone card
- Telephone directory
- Telephone exchange
- Telephone tapping
- Teletraffic engineering
- T1 - Digital PCM (pulse code modulated signal) transmission system based on 1's and 0's and a speed of 1.544mbps
- Time Division Multiplexing (TDM)
- Toll-free_telephone_number (TFN) A telephone number that is billed for all arriving calls, but free for the calling party.
- Trap and trace
- TWX

== U ==
- USOC Universal Service Order Code

== V ==
- Vertical service code
- Voicemail
- Voice over Internet Protocol (VoIP)

== W ==
- Western Union
- Wide Area Telephone Service (WATS)
- WATS line
- Wireless network
- Wireless Telephony Applications Interface (WTAI)
- Wi-Fi

== Z ==
- Zenith number

== Acronyms ==
Acronym	Name	Notes
1ESS	Number 1 Electronic Switching System (Alcatel-Lucent)	US
1FR	Flat rate service	US
2G	second-generation mobile telephone
2.5G	Enhanced 2G mobile telephone
3G	third-generation mobile telephone
4ESS	Number 4 Electronic Switching System (Alcatel-Lucent)
4WTS	Four-wire termination set	US
5ESS	Number 5 Electronic Switching System (Alcatel-Lucent)
ACD	Automatic Call Distribution/Director
ACTS	Advanced Coin Telephone Service	US
ADSL	Asymmetric Digital Subscriber Line
ANI	Automatic Number Identification	US
AMA	Automatic Message Accounting	US
BOK	Unblocking	UK
CCIS	Common Channel Interoffice Signaling
CID	Caller ID
CLEC	Competitive Local Exchange Carrier	US
CLI	Caller Line Identification	Europe
CLID	Caller Line ID	UK
CTI	Computer telephony integration
COSMOS	Wire records
DDCO	Direct Dial Central Office (Opposite of DID)	US
DDD	Direct Distance Dialing	US
DDI	Direct Dialing In	UK
DECT	Digital Enhanced Cordless Telecommunications
DID	Direct Inward Dialing	US
DMS	Digital Multiplex System (e.g. DMS-100)	Can
DNIS	Dialed Number Identification System	US
DSL	Digital subscriber line
DTMF	dual-tone multi-frequency
FDM	Frequency-division multiplexing
GPRS	General Packet Radio Service
GSM	Global system for mobile communications
GST	Ground Start Trunk	US
IDDD	International Direct Distance Dialing	US
IDF	Intermediate distribution frame	US
ILEC	Incumbent Local Exchange Carrier	US
ISD	International Subscriber Dialing	UK and India
ISDN	Integrated Services Digital Network
IVR	Interactive Voice Response (a.k.a. VRU)
KSU	Key Switching/System Unit	US
LST	Loop Start Trunk	US
MDF	Main Distribution Frame
MF	Multi-frequency	US
PABX	Private Automatic Branch eXchange	Europe
PBX	Private Branch eXchange	US
PMBX	Private Manual Branch eXchange	UK
POTS	Plain Old Telephone Service
PSTN	Public Switched Telephone Network
RCMAC	Recent Change Memory Administration Center	US
REN	ringer equivalency number
SMS	Short Message Service (i.e. text messages)
SF	Single Frequency supervision tone (2600)	US
SIP	Session Initiation Protocol	US
SP Lock	Unlocking	UK
SS7	Signaling System 7
STD	Subscriber trunk dialling	UK and India
T-CXR	T-carrier (e.g. T-1)	US
TAPI	Telephony Application Programming Interface
TFN	Toll-free telephone number
TR	Tip and ring	US
TSPS	Traffic Service Position System
TXE	Telephone eXchange Electronic	UK
UAX	Unit Automatic eXchange	UK
VoIP	Voice over Internet Protocol	US
WAP	Wireless Application Protocol
WATS	Wide Area Telephone Service	US
WTAI	Wireless Telephony Applications Interface
