= Lineman's handset =

Type of telephone used for installing and testing telephone lines

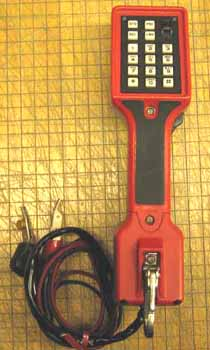
Harris TS22L lineman's handset

A lineman's handset is a special type of telephone used by technicians for installing and testing local loop telephone lines. It is also called a test set, butt set, or buttinski.

== Components ==
A typical lineman's handset integrates an earpiece, a mouthpiece, a dialing interface, and a set of test leads for connecting to the telephone circuit. Originally, lineman's handsets featured a rotary dial, but modern sets use some variant of the standard 12-button DTMF keypad and also employ an amplifier for speaker use. Most handsets are designed to be used with analog "POTS" lines, and have limited or no function with digital circuits. Older telephone linemen also referred to the handset as a "Goat".

In addition to the basic features listed above, handsets often include one or more of:

- Speakerphone
- Redial
- A talk/monitor toggle switch
- Mute
- Hook flash button
- Tone/pulse dialing selection switch
- Low-pass filtering to prevent disruption of data communications (such as DSL)
- A mechanical hook for hanging the set from a tool belt. On some sets, it may be moved to the receiver side, mouthpiece side, or removed altogether.

== Typical use ==
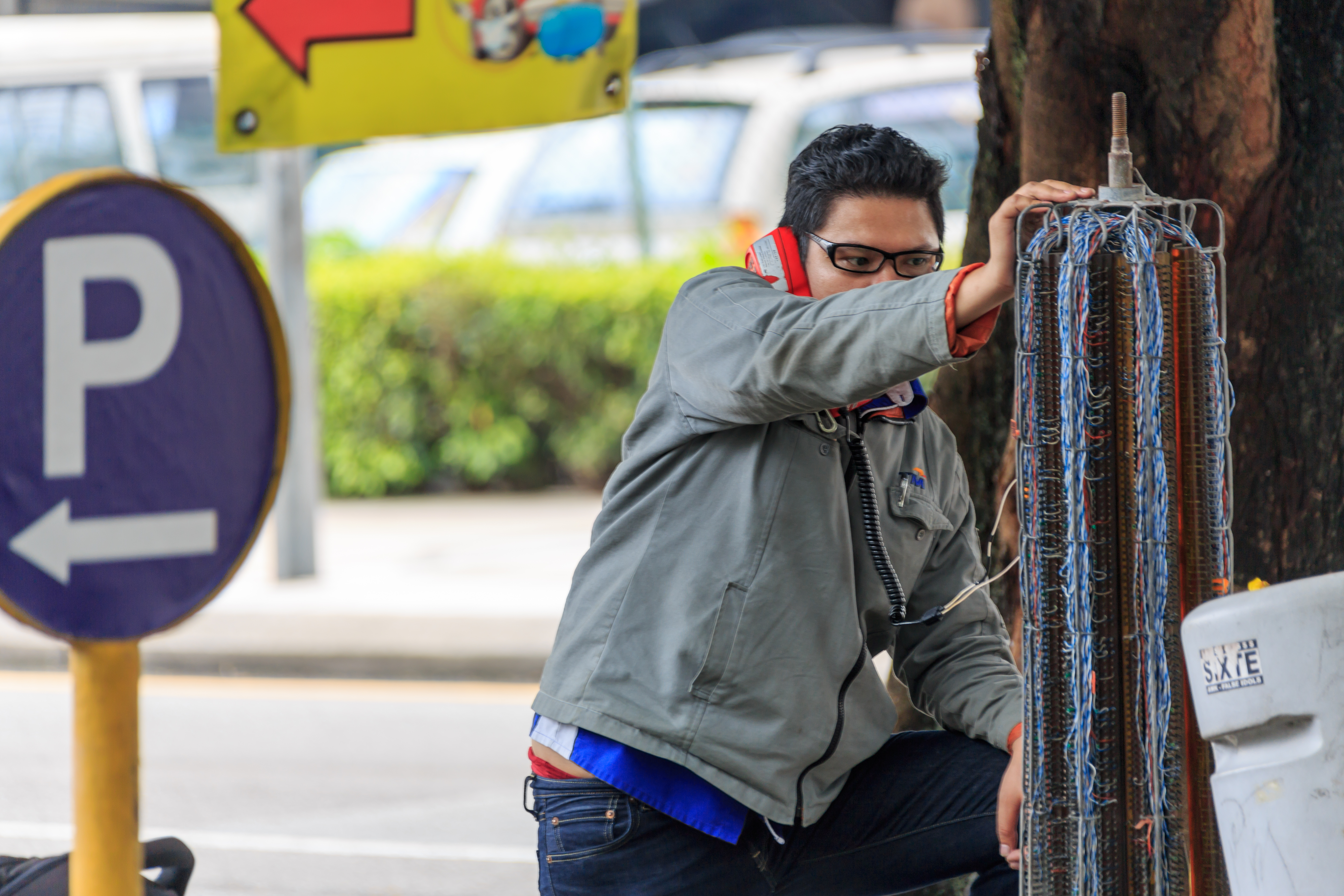
In use

A lineman's handset typically connects via a pair of test leads, not the modular connector found on most consumer telephone equipment. The test leads will feature some combination of alligator clips (to connect to bare wires), a piercing spike or "bed-of-nails" (for insulated wires), and something designed to fit a punch block. Adapters designed to fit other punch block types, heat coil sockets, or modular jacks may also be used.

A butt set can be connected wherever there is a line appearance—anywhere the wires are accessible. Inside the central office, this would be at a main or intermediate distribution frame. For outside plant work, this would include any serving area interface, such as a cross-connect box or aerial splice enclosure. At subscriber sites (e.g., residence), this could be inside or behind the housing of a modular connector or at the network interface.

When connected to a line, a lineman's handset is essentially indistinguishable from regular subscriber equipment. The technician can monitor an active call, answer incoming calls, and make outgoing calls. Common tests include checking for dial tone, using ANAC to identify the line, and using a ringback number.

== See also ==
- Beige box (phreaking)
