= Loop management system =

In local telephone networks, a loop management system (LMS) is a kind or a part of network management system intended to maximize local loop control. Sometimes it is referred to as local loop management (LLM) or copper loop management (CLM).

Although local loop unbundling is a standard process for an incumbent (ILEC), issues remain to be solved in the local loop management process. For a CLEC which borrows lines from ILEC for DSL services provisioning process, a local loop is the most critical (and the most weak) point because of reduced management of this vital part of the network.

During the provisioning process, a CLEC can request from its serving ILEC, a new cross-connect. By agreement ILEC must fulfill this request but it's almost impossible to immediately learn a local loop's quality or monitor its activity in real time. Such steps are sometimes mandatory for loop pretesting and qualification in order to validate its good (or bad) condition. Furthermore, testing and validation steps are vital in troubleshooting process.

LMS, sometimes implemented as a part of a major network management system, views the local loop as an active network element. It speeds pre-qualification and reduces fault correction time.

A complete LMS has software and hardware components. The latter is usually a switch fabric connected both to all required lines and line equipment at either side of a line. The functionality is similar to one performed by a main distribution frame or any other distribution frame, so sometimes is referred to as automated main distribution frame. A software component implies implementing management operations.

Template:Telecomm-infrastructure-stub
