= WTAI =

WTAI may refer to:

- WTAI (FM), a radio station (88.9 FM) licensed to Union City, Tennessee, United States
- WLZR, a radio station (1560 AM) originally licensed in Eau Gallie, Florida, United States which held the call sign WTAI from 1968 to 1997.
- Wireless Telephony Applications Interface in the List of telephony terminology
  - A collection of telephony specific extensions for call and feature control mechanism that make advanced mobile network services available to users
- Where the Action Is television show
