= Fiber to the telecom enclosure =

Standards-compliant structured cabling system architecture

Diagram originally published by the Fiber Optics LAN Section of the Telecommunications Industry Association

Fiber to the Edge (FTTE), fiber to the telecom enclosure (FTTTE) or fiber to the zone (FTTZ), is a fiber to the x networking approach used in the enterprise building (hotels, convention centers, office buildings, hospitals, senior living communities, Multi-Dwelling Units, stadiums, etc.). It is a standards-compliant structured cabling system architecture that extends the optical fiber backbone network from the equipment room directly to a telecommunications enclosure (TE), access node, ONT, or media converter installed in a common space to serve a number of users or devices in a nearby area.

In other words, fiber reaches directly from the main distribution frame of a building out to the edge devices, eliminating or reducing the need for intermediate distribution frames.

== Implementation ==
Its implementation is based on the TIA-569-B “Pathways and Spaces” technical standard, which defines the Telecommunications Enclosure (TE), and TIA/EIA-568-B.1 Addendum 5, which defines the cabling when a TE is used. The FTTE architecture allows for many media choices from the TE to the work area; it may be balanced twisted pair copper, multi-mode optical fiber, or even wireless if an access point is installed in or near the TE.

Depending on the user’s needs, FTTE can be deployed in low-density or high-density configurations. A low-density system might use one or two inexpensive 8-port Ethernet mini-switches as an example (these switches have eight 10/100 Mbit/s Ethernet copper ports and one 1 Gbit/s Ethernet fiber uplink).

A high-density FTTE design might use commonly available 24- or 48-port switches (these switches are configured with one 1 Gbit/s uplink port per twelve 100BASE-TX user ports). This relatively high work area-to-backbone port ratio provides better performance than is typically provided to enterprise users. Both low and high-density FTTE architectures provide excellent performance in terms of bandwidth delivered to the work area.

== Pros and cons ==
- Advantages
  - Low Cost
  - Non-blocking or low-blocking performance better supports convergence
  - Extremely flexible to deploy; supports Moves, Adds & Changes
  - Enables consolidation of electronics into a centralized Telecommunications Room
  - Allows the use of a variety of media from the TE to the user
- Disadvantages
  - TE location is near the user and must be secured

== See also ==
- BICSI
- Fiber in the loop
- Fiber to the x
- Fiber-optic communication
- Hybrid fibre-coaxial
- Network architecture

== External resources ==
- TIA Fiber Optic Standardization Subcommittees
- Fiber Optics LAN Section of the Telecommunications Industry Association
- Fiber Optics Association
