= Fiber to the x =

Broadband network architecture term

A schematic illustrating how FTTX (Node, Curb, Building, Home) architectures vary with regard to the distance between the optical fiber and the end user. The building on the left is the central office; the building on the right is one of the buildings served by the central office. Dotted rectangles represent separate living or office spaces within the same building.

Fiber to the x (FTTX; also spelled "fibre") or fiber in the loop is a generic term for any broadband network architecture using optical fiber to provide all or part of the local loop used for last mile telecommunications. As fiber optic cables are able to carry much more data than copper cables, especially over long distances, copper telephone networks built in the 20th century are being replaced by fiber. The carrier equipment for FTTx is often housed in a "fiber hut", point of presence or central office.

FTTX is a generalization for several configurations of fiber deployment, arranged into two groups: FTTP/FTTH/FTTB (fiber laid all the way to the premises/home/building) and FTTC/N (fiber laid to the cabinet/node, with copper wires completing the connection).

Residential areas already served by balanced pair distribution plant call for a trade-off between cost and capacity. The closer the fiber head, the higher the cost of construction and the higher the channel capacity. In places not served by metallic facilities, little cost is saved by not running fiber to the home.

Fiber to the x is the key method used to drive next-generation access (NGA), which describes a significant upgrade to the broadband available by making a step change in speed and quality of the service. This is typically thought of as asymmetrical with a download speed of 24 Mbit/s plus and a fast upload speed. Ofcom have defined super-fast broadband as "broadband products that provide a maximum download speed that is greater than 24 Mbit/s – this threshold is commonly considered to be the maximum speed that can be supported on current generation (copper-based) networks."

A similar network called a hybrid fiber-coaxial (HFC) network is used by cable television operators but is usually not synonymous with "fiber In the loop", although similar advanced services are provided by the HFC networks. Fixed wireless and mobile wireless technologies such as Wi-Fi, WiMAX and 3GPP Long Term Evolution (LTE) are an alternative for providing Internet access.

== Definitions ==
The telecommunications industry differentiates between several distinct FTTX configurations. The terms in most widespread use today are:

- FTTE (fiber-to-the-edge) is a networking approach used in the enterprise building (hotels, convention centers, office buildings, hospitals, senior living communities, Multi-Dwelling Units, stadiums, etc.). Fiber reaches directly from the main distribution frame of a building out to the edge devices, eliminating the need for intermediate distribution frames.
- FTTP (fiber-to-the-premises): This term is used either as a blanket term for both FTTH and FTTB, or where the fiber network includes both homes and small businesses
  - FTTH (fiber-to-the-home): Fiber reaches the boundary of the living space, such as a box on the outside wall of a home. Passive optical networks and point-to-point Ethernet are architectures that are capable of delivering triple-play services over FTTH networks directly from an operator's central office. Typically providing between 1 and 10 Gbit/s
  - FTTB (fiber-to-the-building, -business, or -basement): Fiber reaches the boundary of the building, such as the basement in a multi-dwelling unit, with the final connection to the individual living space being made via alternative means, similar to the curb or pole technologies. It can currently reach symmetrical 10 Gbit/s with G.mgfast.
  - FTTD can mean two different things:
    - (fiber-to-the-desktop or -desk): In an office, fiber connection is installed from the main computer room to a desk or fiber media converter near the user's desk.
    - (fiber-to-the-door): Fiber reaches outside the flat.
  - FTTR can mean three different things:
    - (fiber-to-the-radio): Fiber runs to the transceivers of base stations.
    - (fiber-to-the-router): Fiber connection is installed from the router to the ISP's fiber network.
    - (fiber-to-the-room): Fiber connection is extended from the router to rooms in the building.
  - FTTO (fiber-to-the-office): Fiber connection is installed from the main computer room/core switch to a special mini-switch (called FTTO Switch) located at the user's workstation or service points. This mini-switch provides Ethernet services to end user devices via standard twisted pair patch cords. The switches are decentralised and located all over the building, but managed from one central point.
  - FTTF can mean five different things:
    - (fiber-to-the-factory): fiber runs to factory buildings.
    - (fiber-to-the-farm): fiber runs to agricultural farms.
    - (fiber-to-the-feeder): a synonym of FTTN
    - (fiber-to-the-floor): fiber reaches a junction box at a floor of a building.
    - (fiber-to-the-frontage): This is very similar to FTTB. In a fiber to the front yard scenario, each fiber node serves a single subscriber. It can currently reach symmetrical 10 Gbit/s with G.mgfast. The fiber node may be reverse-powered by the subscriber modem.
  - FTTM can mean four different things:
    - (fiber-to-the-machine): In a factory, fiber runs to machines.
    - (fiber-to-the-mast): Fiber runs to wireless masts.
    - (fiber-to-the-mobile): Fiber runs to base stations.
    - (fiber-to-the-multi-dwelling-unit): FTTP to apartment buildings
  - FTTT can mean three different things:
    - (fiber-to-the-terminal): In an office, fiber runs to desktop equipment.
    - (fiber-to-the-tower): Fiber reaches base stations.
    - (fiber-to-the-tent): For example, at hacker camps such as BornHack in Denmark.
  - FTTW (fiber-to-the-wall or -workgroup): In an office, fiber runs to small switches near a group of users.
- FTTA can mean two different things:
  - (fiber-to-the-amplifier): Fiber runs to street cabinets.
  - (fiber-to-the-antenna): Fiber runs up antenna towers.
- FTTCS (fiber-to-the-cell-site): fiber reaches the base station site.
- FTTE / FTTZ (fiber-to-the-telecom-enclosure or fiber-to-the-zone): is a form of structured cabling typically used in enterprise local area networks, where fiber is used to link the main computer equipment room to an enclosure close to the desk or workstation. FTTE and FTTZ are not considered part of the FTTX group of technologies, despite the similarity in name.
- FTTdp (fiber-to-the-distribution-point): This is very similar to FTTC / FTTN but is one-step closer again, moving the end of the fiber to within meters of the boundary of the customers premises in the last possible junction box, known as the "distribution point". This allows for near-gigabit speeds
- FTTL (fiber-to-the-loop): general term
- FTTN / FTTLA (fiber-to-the-node, -neighborhood, or -last-amplifier): Fiber is terminated in a street cabinet, possibly miles away from the customer premises, with the final connections being copper. FTTN is often an interim step toward full FTTH (fiber-to-the-home) and is typically used to deliver 'advanced' triple-play telecommunications services
- FTTC / FTTK (fiber-to-the-curb/kerb, -closet, or -cabinet): This is very similar to FTTN, but the street cabinet or pole is closer to the user's premises, typically within 300 m (1,000 ft), within range for high-bandwidth copper technologies such as wired Ethernet or IEEE 1901 power line networking and wireless Wi-Fi technology. FTTC is occasionally ambiguously called FTTP (fiber-to-the-pole), leading to confusion with the distinct fiber-to-the-premises system. Typically providing up to 100 Mbit/s
- FTTS can mean three different things:
  - (fiber-to-the-screen or -seat): On an airplane, fiber reaches the IFE screens.
  - (fiber-to-the-street): The customer is connected using copper to the fiber passing near the building, up to 200 m (700 ft) away. This is a compromise between FTTB and FTTC. Typically providing up to 500 Mbit/s
  - (fiber-to-the-subscriber): This is a synonym for FTTP.

To promote consistency, especially when comparing FTTH penetration rates between countries, the three FTTH Councils of Europe, North America, and Asia-Pacific agreed upon definitions for FTTH and FTTB in 2006, with an update in 2009, 2011 and another in 2015. The FTTH Councils do not have formal definitions for FTTC and FTTN.

== Fiber to the premises ==
Fiber to the premises (FTTP) is a form of fiber-optic communication delivery in which an optical fiber is run in an optical distribution network from the central office all the way to the premises occupied by the subscriber. The term "FTTP" has become ambiguous and may also refer to FTTC where the fiber terminates at a utility pole without reaching the premises.

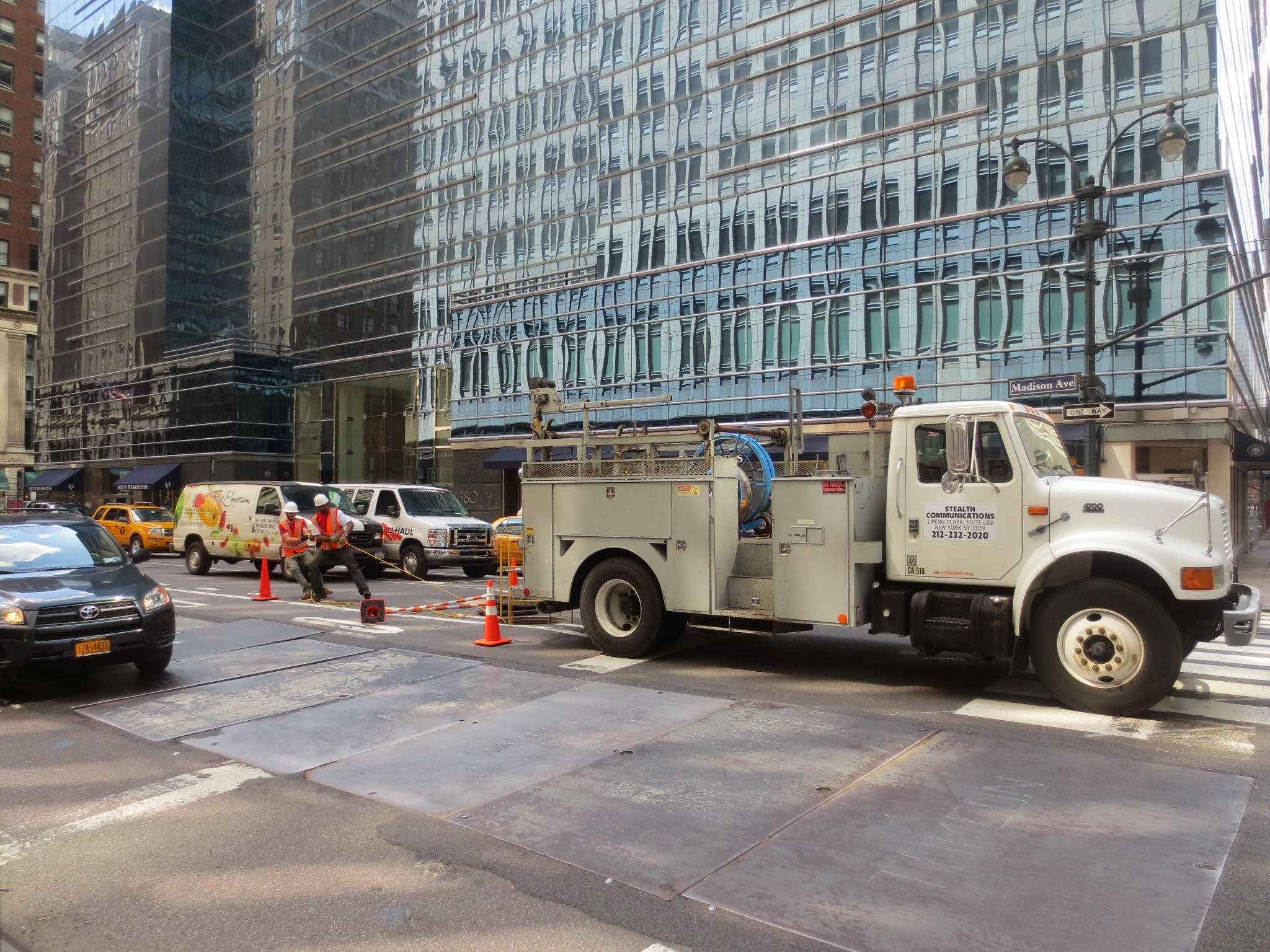
Fiber-optic cable being pulled underneath the streets of New York City

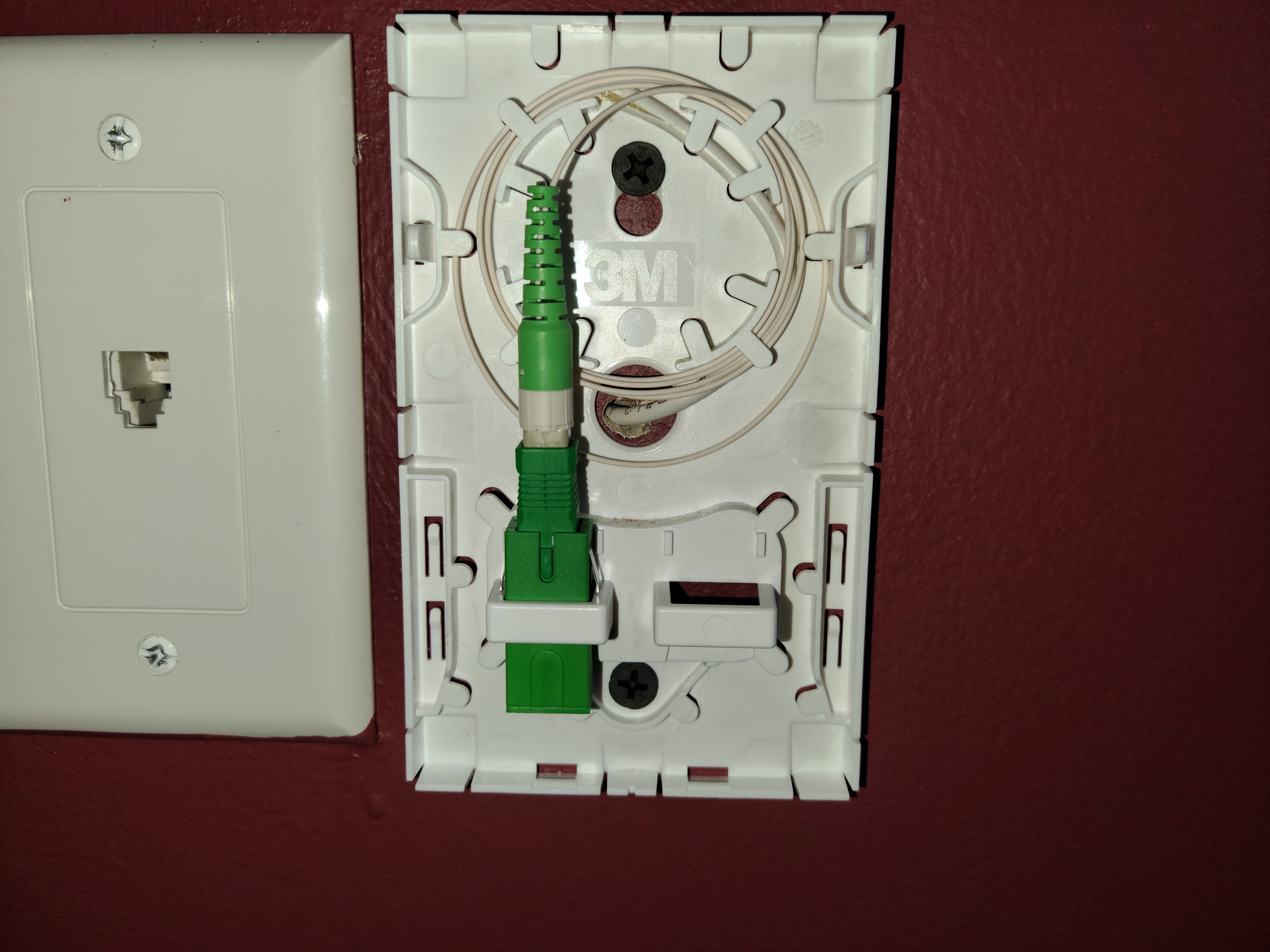
An optical fiber jack (cover removed) in a residence with FTTH service

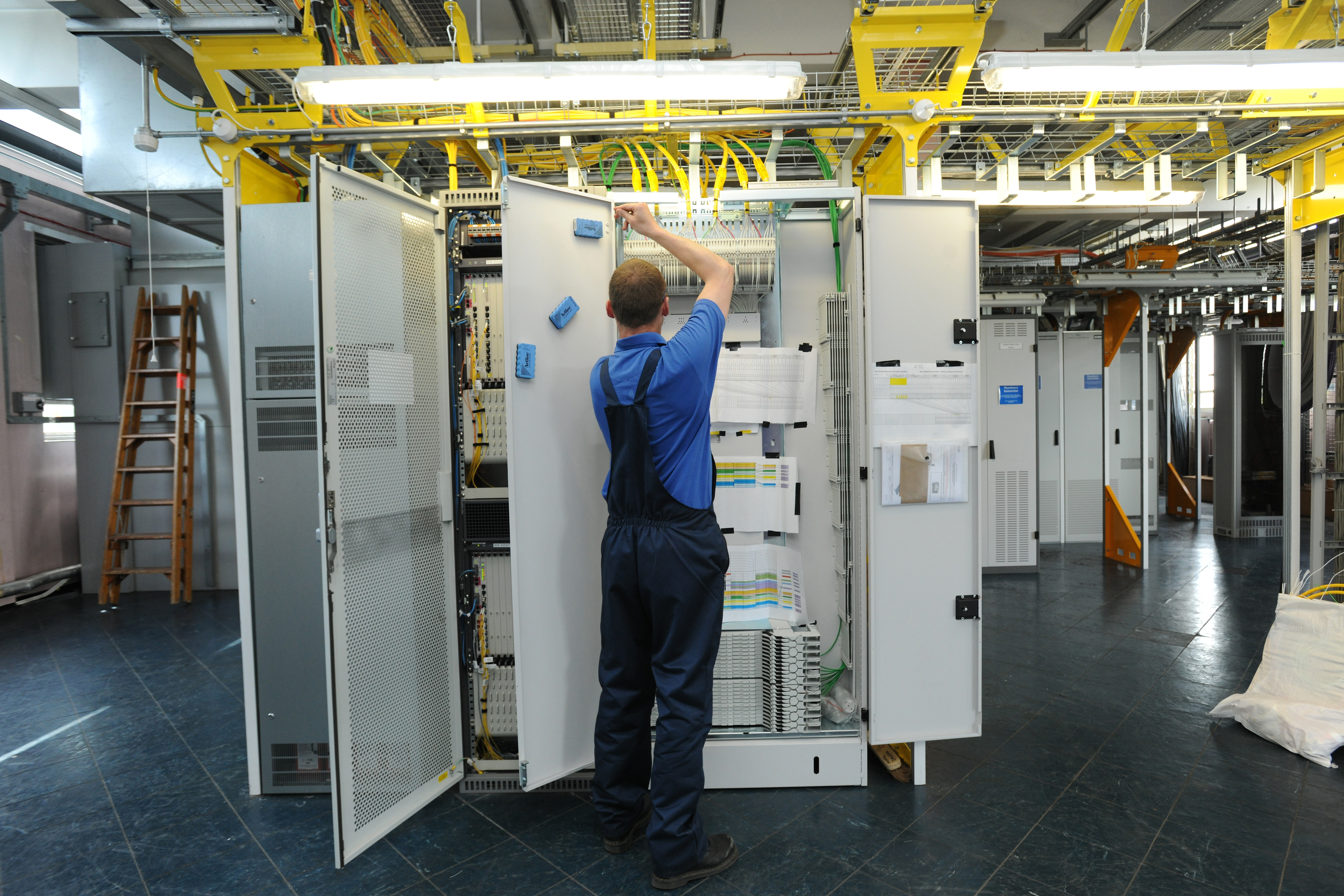
ISP equipment for FTTH. In the center there is an Optical Consolidation Rack for connecting the ISP to the outside plant cables that connect to customers. To the left there are Optical Line Terminals which send and receive data to customers as part of a PON network

Fiber to the premises can be categorized according to where the optical fiber ends:

- FTTH (fiber-to-the-home) is a form of fiber-optic communication delivery that reaches one living or working space. The fiber extends from the central office to the subscriber's living or working space. Once at the subscriber's living or working space, the signal may be conveyed throughout the space using any means, including twisted pair, coaxial cable, Wireless, power line communication, or optical fiber.
- FTTB (fiber-to-the-building or -basement) is a form of fiber-optic communication delivery that necessarily applies only to those properties that contain multiple living or working spaces. The optical fiber terminates before actually reaching the subscribers living or working space itself, but does extend to the property containing that living or working space. The signal is conveyed the final distance using any non-optical means, including twisted pair, coaxial cable, wireless, or power line communication.

An apartment building may provide an example of the distinction between FTTH and FTTB. If a fiber is run to a panel inside each subscriber's apartment unit, it is FTTH. If instead, the fiber goes only as far as the apartment building's shared electrical room (either only to the ground floor or to each floor), it is FTTB.

Fibre-to-the-home cable.
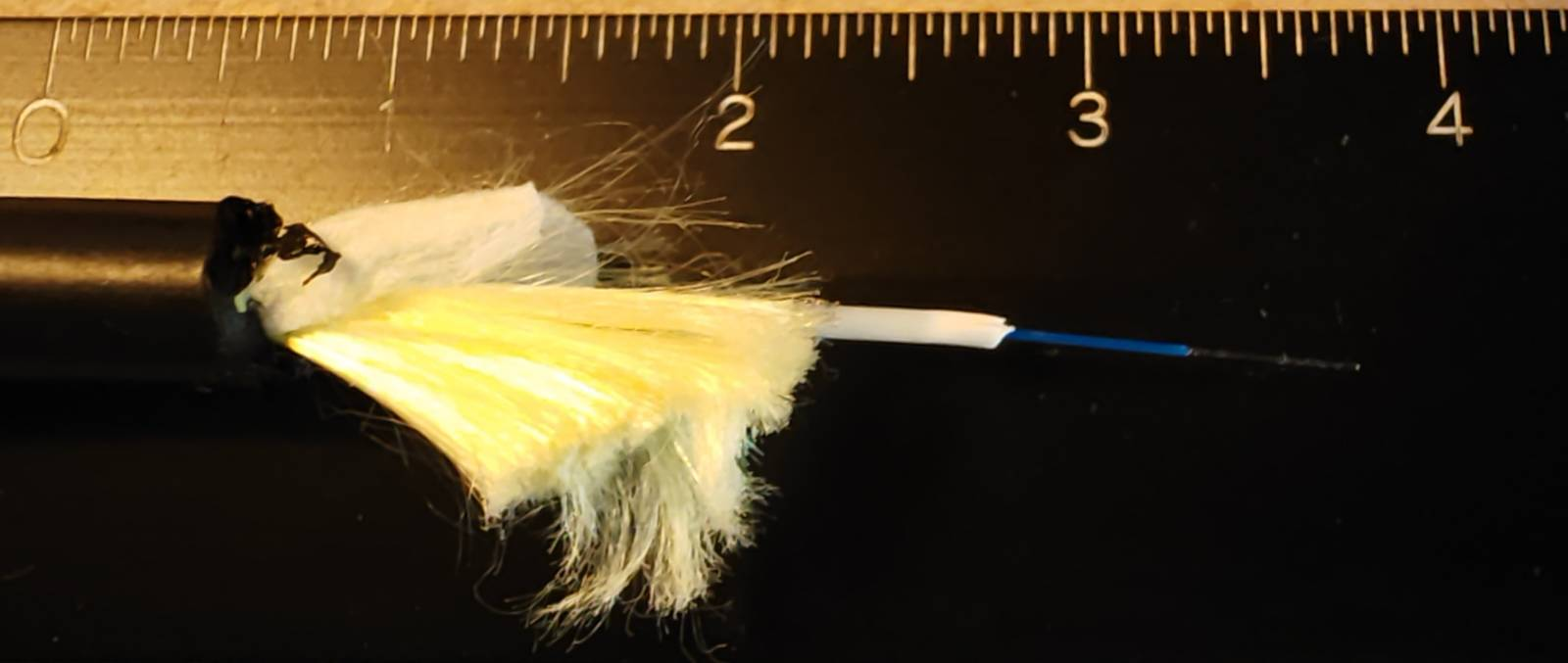

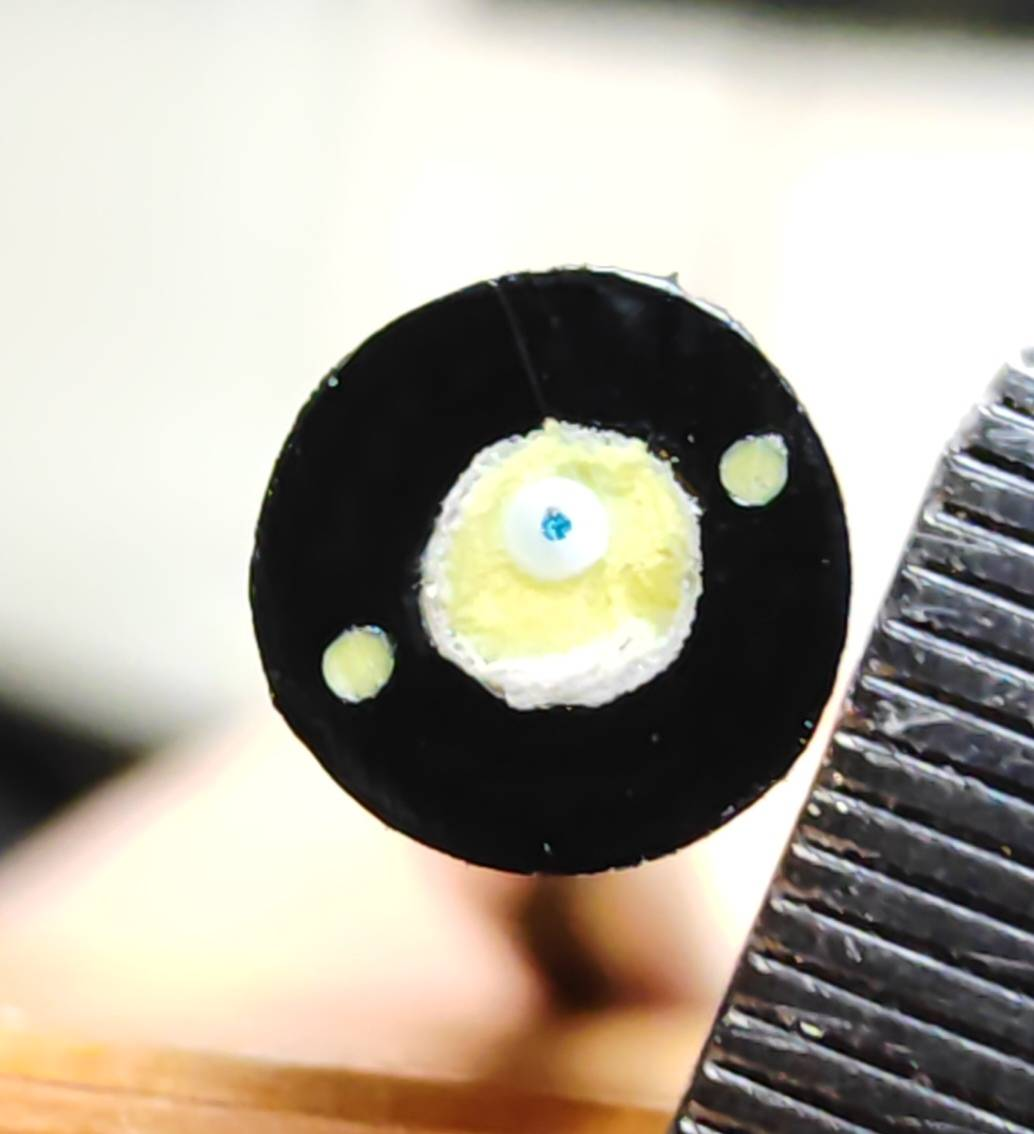
This cable is outdoor-grade. Approximate diameters: Outer sheath: 5 mm, outer white paper wrapper: ⌀2.5 mm, inner white plastic sheath: ⌀890 μm, blue sheath: ⌀250 μm, optical fiber: ⌀150 μm

== Fiber to the curb/cabinet/node ==
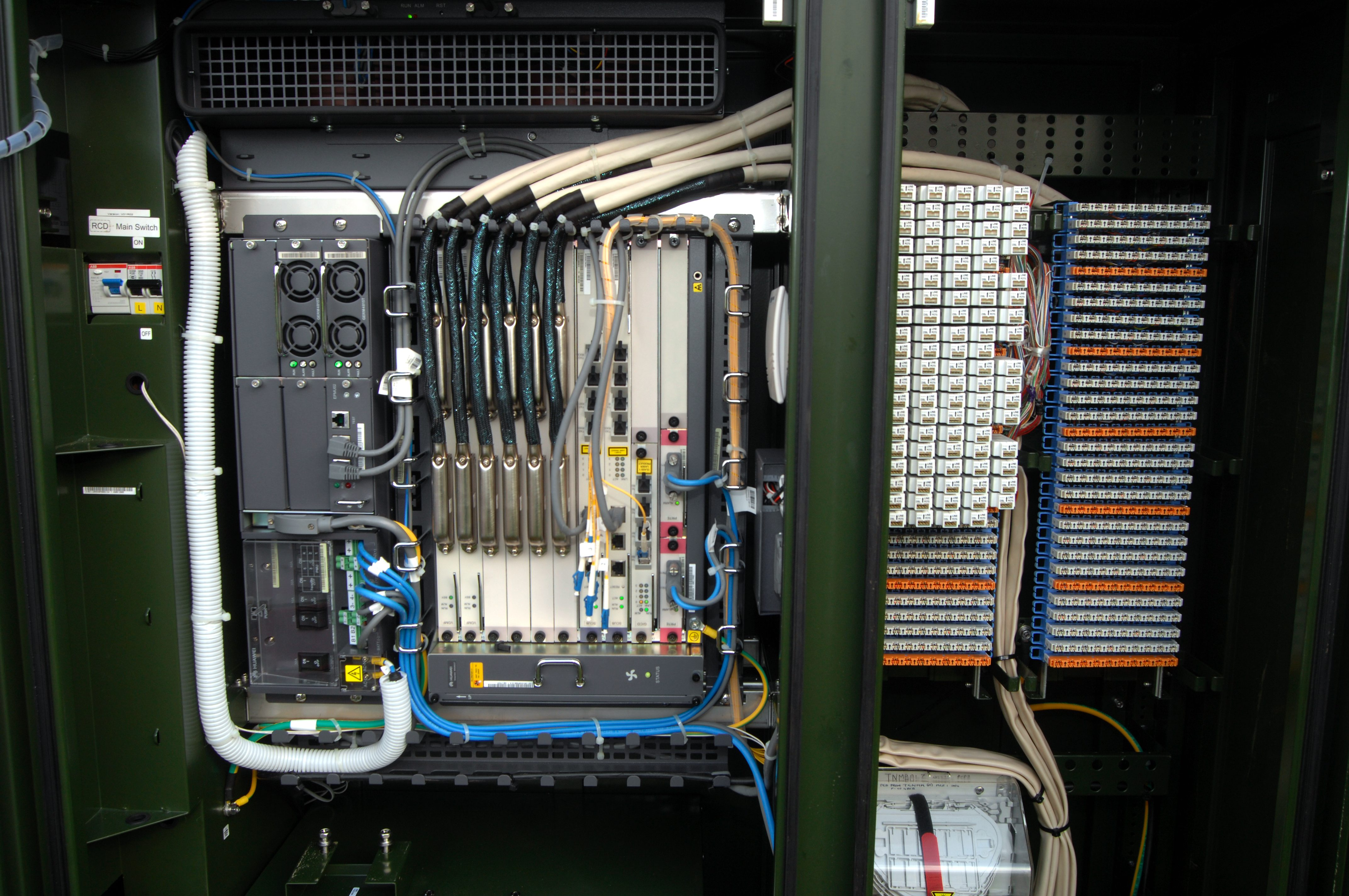
Inside an FTTN or FTTC fiber cabinet. The left side contains the fiber and a DSLAM, and the right side contains the copper and punch down blocks for a form of DSL such as VDSL

Fiber to the curb/cabinet (FTTC) is a telecommunications system based on fiber-optic cables run to a platform that serves several customers. Each of these customers has a connection to this platform via coaxial cable or twisted pair. Here "curb" is an abstraction and can just as easily mean a pole-mounted device or communications closet or a shed. Typically any system terminating fiber within 300 m (1,000 ft) of the customer premises equipment would be described as FTTC.

Fiber to the node or neighborhood (FTTN), sometimes identified with and sometimes distinguished from fiber to the cabinet (FTTC), is a telecommunication architecture based on fiber-optic cables run to a cabinet serving a neighborhood. Customers typically connect to this cabinet using traditional coaxial cable or twisted pair wiring. The area served by the cabinet is usually less than one mile in radius and can contain several hundred customers.

FTTN allows delivery of broadband services such as high-speed internet. High-speed communications protocols such as broadband cable access (typically DOCSIS) or some form of digital subscriber line (DSL) are used between the cabinet and the customers. Data rates vary according to the exact protocol used and according to how close the customer is to the cabinet.

Unlike FTTP, FTTN often uses existing coaxial or twisted-pair infrastructure to provide last mile service and is thus less costly to deploy. In the long term, however, its bandwidth potential is limited relative to implementations that bring the fiber still closer to the subscriber.

A variant of this technique for cable television providers is used in a hybrid fiber-coaxial (HFC) system. It is sometimes given the acronym FTTLA (fiber-to-the-last-amplifier) when it replaces analog amplifiers up to the last one before the customer (or neighborhood of customers).

FTTC allows delivery of broadband services such as high-speed internet. Usually, existing wire is used with communications protocols such as broadband cable access (typically DOCSIS) or some form of DSL connecting the curb/cabinet and the customers. In these protocols, the data rates vary according to the exact protocol used and according to how close the customer is to the cabinet.

Where it is feasible to run new cable, both fiber and copper Ethernet are capable of connecting the "curb" with a full 100 Mbit/s or 1 Gbit/s connection. Even using relatively cheap outdoor category 5 copper over hundreds of meters, all Ethernet protocols including power over Ethernet (PoE) are supported. Most fixed wireless technologies rely on PoE, including Motorola Canopy, which has low-power radios capable of running on a 12 VDC power supply fed over several tens of meters of cable.

Power line networking deployments also rely on FTTC. Using the IEEE P1901 protocol (or its predecessor HomePlug AV) existing electric service cables move up to 1 Gbit/s from the curb/pole/cabinet into every AC electrical outlet in the home—coverage equivalent to a robust Wi-Fi implementation, with the added advantage of a single cable for power and data.

By avoiding new cable and its cost and liabilities, FTTC costs less to deploy. However, it also has historically had lower bandwidth potential than FTTP. In practice, the relative advantage of fiber depends on the bandwidth available for backhaul, usage-based billing restrictions that prevent full use of last-mile capabilities, and customer premises equipment and maintenance restrictions, and the cost of running fiber that can vary widely with geography and building type.

In the United States and Canada, the largest deployment of FTTC was carried out by BellSouth Telecommunications. With the acquisition of BellSouth by AT&T, deployment of FTTC will end. Future deployments will be based on either FTTN or FTTP. Existing FTTC plant may be removed and replaced with FTTP. Verizon, meanwhile, announced in March 2010 they were winding down Verizon FiOS expansion, concentrating on completing their network in areas that already had FiOS franchises but were not deploying to new areas, suggesting that FTTH was uneconomic beyond these areas.

Verizon also announced (at CES 2010) its entry into the smart home and power utility data management arenas, indicating it was considering using P1901-based FTTC or some other existing-wire approach to reach into homes, and access additional revenues from the secure AES-128 bandwidth required for advanced metering infrastructure. However, the largest 1 Gbit/s deployment in the United States, in Chattanooga, Tennessee, despite being conducted by power utility EPB, was FTTH rather than FTTC, reaching every subscriber in a 600-square-mile area. Monthly pricing of US$350 reflected this generally high cost of deployment. However, Chattanooga EPB has reduced the monthly pricing to US$70/month.

Historically, both telephone and cable companies avoided hybrid networks using several different modes of transport from their point of presence into customer premises. The increased competitive cost pressure, availability of three different existing wire solutions, smart grid deployment requirements (as in Chattanooga), and better hybrid networking tools (with major vendors like Alcatel-Lucent and Qualcomm Atheros, and Wi-Fi solutions for edge networks, IEEE 1905 and IEEE 802.21 protocol efforts and SNMP improvements) all make FTTC deployments more likely in areas uneconomic to serve with FTTP/FTTH. In effect FTTC serves as a halfway measure between fixed wireless and FTTH, with special advantages for smart appliances and electric vehicles that rely on PLC use already.

== Deployments ==
Operators around the world have been rolling out high-speed Internet access networks since the mid-2000s. Some used a network topology known as Active Ethernet Point-to-Point to deliver services from its central office directly into subscribers' homes. Fiber termination was handled by a residential gateway provided by Advanced Digital Broadcast inside a subscriber's home to be shared with other consumer electronics (CE) devices.

Since 2007, Italian access providers Fastweb, Vodafone, and Wind participated in an initiative called Fiber for Italy, with the aim of creating a countrywide fiber-to-the-home network in Italy. The pilot taking place in the Italian capital, Rome, has seen symmetrical bandwidth of 100 Mbit/s. Telecom Italia, which refused to take part in the Fiber for Italy initiative, had an even more ambitious plan to bring fiber-to-the-home and fiber-to-the-business to 138 cities by 2018.

By the end of December 2010, the total number of fiber-to-the-home enabled homes had passed 2.5 million, with more than 348,000 subscribers.)

In September 2010, the European Commission published a new "Recommendation for Regulated Access to NGA Networks" along with a list of measures to promote the deployment of fast broadband and next-generation access networks.

Portugal Telecom planned to complete its fiber-to-the-home (FTTH) nationwide rollout by 2020. The company’s telecommunications services are now operated under the MEO brand, which as of 2025 offers fiber connections with speeds of up to 10 Gbit/s, using XGS-PON technology, available in most urban areas of Portugal.

Between September 2017 and March 2019, the number of European FTTH and FTTB subscribers increased by nearly 16%. By 2025, the total number of premises passed by FTTH and FTTB infrastructure is expected to reach 187 million throughout Europe.

Active Line Access is an evolving standard for the provision of services over FTTP networks in the United Kingdom proposed by the regulator Ofcom and developed by the Network Interoperability Consultative Committee.

=== FTTS, FTTH and FTTB ===
Most FTTH deployments follow one of four primary architecture types: centralized split, distributed split, star architecture, or daisy-chaining. Fiber network developers choose architectures based on a variety of factors, such as the physical geography of the local environment, number of anticipated subscribers, and labor force skill. It is important to distinguish cable and fiber architecture, because while the cable structure can follow one type of architecture, the fibers inside can follow a completely different one.

=== FTTN and FTTC ===
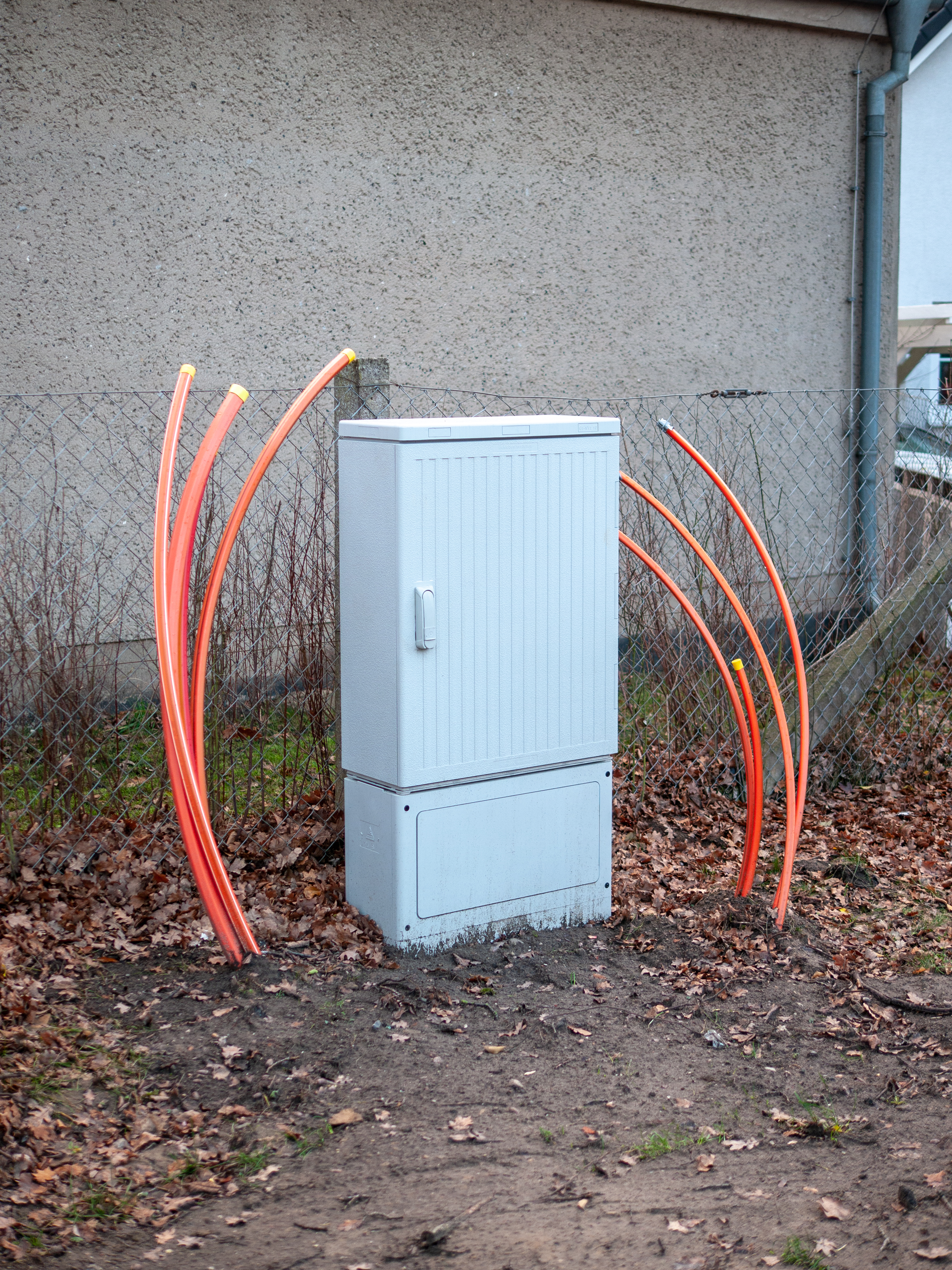
FTTC during installation in Germany

FTTN/C is seen as an interim step towards full FTTH and in many cases triple-play services delivered using this approach to provide up to around 100 Mbit/s have been proven to grow subscriber numbers and ARPU considerably FTTN/C is currently used by a number of operators, including AT&T in the United States, Germany's Deutsche Telekom, Greece's OTE, Swisscom, Telecom Italia in Italy, Proximus in Belgium, nbn™ in Australia, and Canadian operators Telus, Cogeco and Bell Canada.

== Optical distribution networks ==
=== Direct fiber ===
The conceptually simplest optical distribution network architecture is direct fiber: that is, each fiber leaving the central office goes to exactly one customer. These networks can support tremendous bandwidth, but are expensive because of both the number of individual fibers and the necessary equipment in the central office.

Direct fiber is generally favored by new entrants and competitive operators. A benefit is that no layer 2 networking technologies are excluded, whether Passive Optical Network (PON), active optical network (AON), or other. Any form of regulatory remedy is possible using this topology.

=== Shared fiber ===
More commonly, each fiber leaving the central office is actually shared by many customers. It is not until such a fiber gets relatively close to the customers that it is split into individual customer-specific fibers. AONs and PONs both achieve this split.

=== Active optical network ===
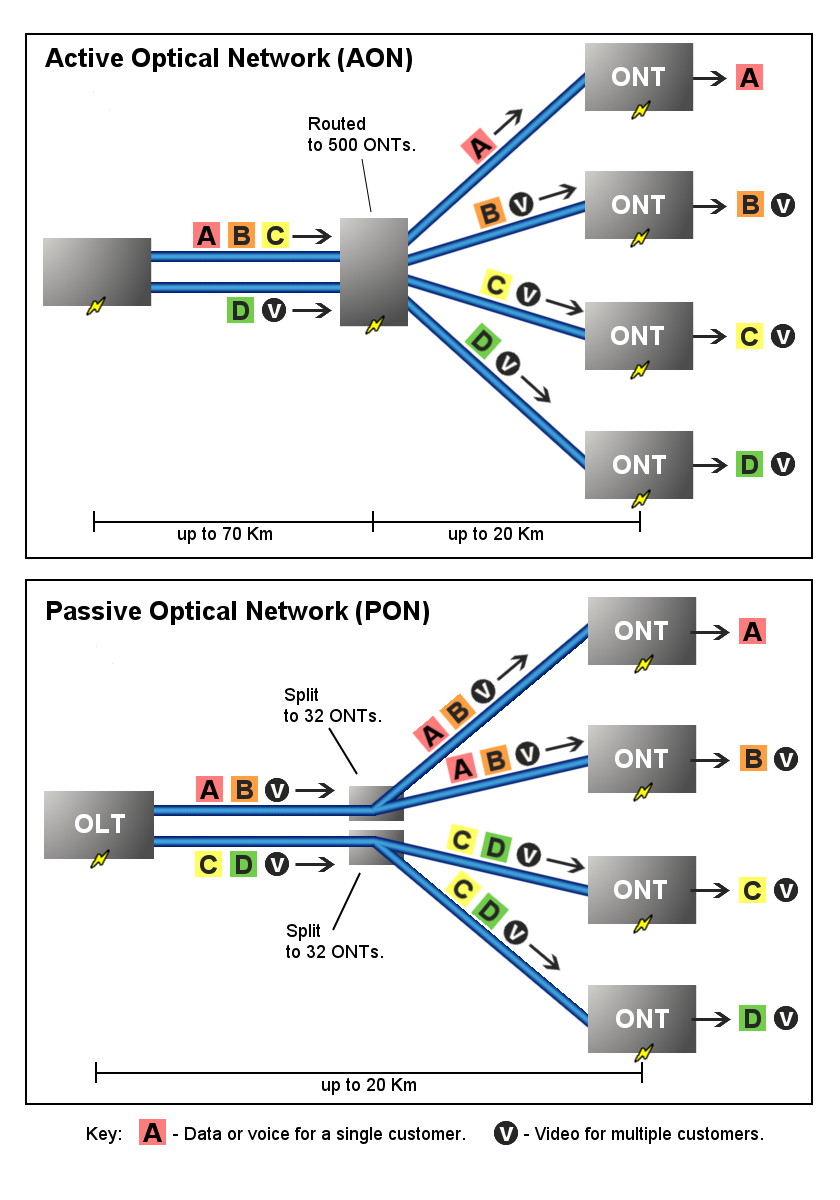
Comparison showing how a typical AON (a star network capable of multicasting) handles downstream traffic differently from a typical PON (a star network having multiple splitters housed in the same cabinet)

AONs rely on electrically powered network equipment to distribute the signal, such as a switch or router. Normally, signals need an optical-electrical-optical transformation in the AON. Each signal leaving the central office is directed only to the customer for whom it is intended.

Incoming signals from the customers avoid colliding at the intersection because the powered equipment there provides buffering. Active Ethernet (a type of Ethernet in the first mile) is a common AON, which uses optical Ethernet switches to distribute the signal, incorporating the customers' premises and the central office into a large switched Ethernet network. Ethernet in the first mile deployments follow a point to point or star network topology and are often based on Fast Ethernet speeds of up to 100 Mbit/s.

Such networks are identical to Ethernet computer networks used in businesses and academic institutions, except that their purpose is to connect homes and buildings to a central office rather than to connect computers and printers within a location. Each switching cabinet can handle up to 1,000 customers, although 400–500 is more typical.

This neighborhood equipment performs layer 2 switching or layer 3 switching and routing, offloading full layer 3 routing to the carrier's central office. The IEEE 802.3ah standard enables service providers to deliver up to 1000 Mbit/s, full-duplex, over one single-mode optical fiber FTTP, depending on the provider.

=== Passive optical network ===
A Passive Optical Network (PON) is a point-to-multipoint FTTP network architecture in which unpowered optical splitters are used to enable a single optical fiber to serve up to 128 customers. A PON reduces the fiber and central office equipment required compared with point-to-point architecture. Because of this, and because it needs no powered splitters or other active components from the moment it leaves the ISP's facilities until it reaches the customer, many ISPs prefer this technology.

The downstream signal coming from the central office is broadcast to each customer premises sharing a fiber. Encryption is used to prevent eavesdropping. Upstream signals are combined using a multiple-access protocol, usually time-division multiple access (TDMA).

=== Ethernet point-to-point ===
Point-to-Point Protocol over Ethernet (PPPoE) is a common way of delivering triple- and quad-play (voice, video, data, and mobile) services over both fiber and hybrid fiber-coaxial (HFC) networks. Active PPPoE uses dedicated fiber from an operator's central office all the way to the subscribers' homes, while hybrid networks (often FTTN) use it to transport data via fiber to an intermediate point to ensure sufficiently high throughput speeds over last-mile copper connections.

This approach has become increasingly popular in recent years with telecoms service providers in both North America (AT&T, Telus, for example) and Europe's Fastweb, Telecom Italia, Telekom Austria and Deutsche Telekom, for example. Google has also looked into this approach, amongst others, as a way to deliver multiple services over open-access networks in the United States.

=== Electrical network ===
Once on private property, the signal is typically converted into an electrical format.

The optical network terminal (ONT, an ITU-T term) or unit (ONU, an identical IEEE term) converts the optical signal into an electrical signal using thin film filter technology. These units require electrical power for their operation, so some providers connect them to backup batteries in case of power outages to ensure emergency access to telecommunications. The optical line terminals "range" the optical network terminals or units in order to provide TDMA time slot assignments for upstream communication.

For FTTH and for some forms of FTTB, it is common for the building's existing Ethernet, phone, and cable TV systems to connect directly to the optical network terminal or unit. If all three systems cannot directly reach the unit, it is possible to combine signals and transport them over a common medium such as Ethernet. Once closer to the end user, equipment such as a router or network interface controller can separate the signals and convert them into the appropriate protocol.

For FTTC and FTTN, the combined internet, video and telephone signal travels to the building over existing telephone or cable wiring until it reaches the end-user's living space, where a VDSL or DOCSIS modem converts data and video signals into Ethernet protocol, which is sent over the end-user's category 5 cable.

== See also ==
- National broadband plan
