= Combined distribution frame =

In telecommunications, a combined distribution frame (CDF) is a distribution frame that combines the functions of main and intermediate distribution frames and contains both vertical and horizontal terminating blocks.

The vertical blocks are used to terminate the permanent outside lines entering the station. Horizontal blocks are used to terminate inside plant equipment. This arrangement permits the association of any outside line with any desired terminal equipment. These connections are made either with twisted pair wire, normally referred to as jumper wire, or with optical fiber cables, normally referred to as jumper cables.

In technical control facilities, the vertical side may be used to terminate equipment as well as outside lines. The horizontal side is then used for jackfields and battery terminations.
