= Recent change memory administration center =

RCMAC stands for recent change memory administration center, sometimes mistakenly called recent change message accounting center, in late 20th century Bell System parlance, or recent change memory administration group (RCMAG). It is an organization of people in a phone company which is responsible for programming the service and features purchased by residential and business customers into the central office. Generally the term is used only in large US phone companies called Regional Bell Operating Companies (RBOCs).

Installing a telephone line is a complex process, involving coordinated work on outside plant and inside. Inside plant work includes running a jumper on the main distribution frame and programming the switch. Middle 20th century crossbar switches had no computer, hence the same workers who installed the jumper generally wired the necessary information into switch cross connect translations as well. Records were kept as pencil notations in ledger books or index cards.

Stored program control exchanges in the 1970s had teleprinter channels for entering and verifying translation information, which allowed centralizing these functions. In the 1980s, the resulting conglomeration of Teletype machines were replaced with a more organized system called MARCH which could more easily be coordinated with COSMOS, TIRKS and other operations support systems.

Generally, the existence of the RCMAC organization started with 1A switches from Bell Labs (later Lucent, now known as Alcatel-Lucent), from which the term "recent change memory" originated.

With the introduction of various automation systems, the function of the RCMAC would recently be described as an organization of people in the phone company responsible for programming the service and features of phone service where service orders have failed to follow the automated process, investigate and resolve customer trouble reports possibly related to incorrect programming of service and features, and to support outside plant technicians repairing or installing a customer's phone service.
