= Automated main distribution frame =

An Automated main distribution frame (AMDF), (i.e. automated switching matrix, automated distribution frame, loop management system (LMS)), provides connectivity between subscribers (local loop, outside plant) and office equipment (inside plant) lines in a telephone exchange (central office, CO) main distribution frame (MDF).

At the beginning of the 21st century the connections (n-subscriber lines and m-office equipment lines) are established or removed manually using a twisted pair of copper wires (jumper).

An automated main distribution frame provides, after an initial installation of all relevant subscriber, and office equipment lines, remote controlled and locally performed connectivity by switching via the switching matrix of an AMDF.

Advantages of automated main distribution frame include reduced switching time, reduced errors in execution and documentation, no truck-roll for each subscriber connection to be established, and reduction of operational expenditures (OPEX). These advantages are typically only off-setting the initial investment in the AMDF equipment in places with relatively high labor cost and an "active" telephony market where subscribers have a choice of multiple service providers leading to many MDF changes.

== See also ==
- Digital cross-connect system
- Loop management system
