= G.fast =

ITU-T Recommendation

- Fast access to subscriber terminals
- Status: In force
- Year started: 5 December 2014
- Latest version: (10/20); October 2020
- Organization: ITU-T
- Committee: ITU-T Study Group 15
- Base standards: G.997.2; G.9700; G.9701
- Domain: telecommunication
- License: Freely available
- Website: www.itu.int/rec/T-REC-G.997.2/; www.itu.int/rec/T-REC-G.9700/; www.itu.int/rec/T-REC-G.9701/

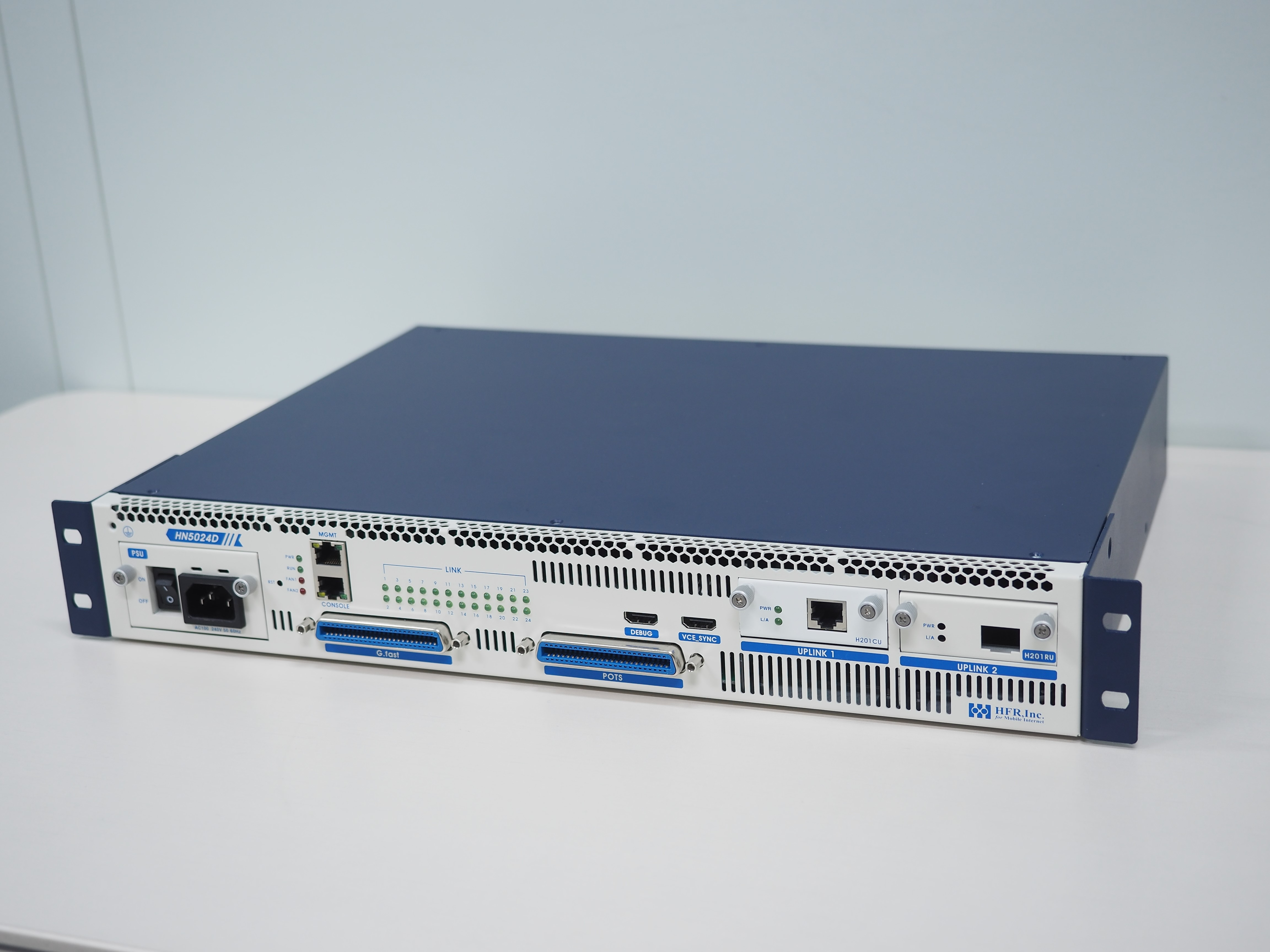
Sckipio 24-port DPU (Distribution point unit), provides G.fast service.

G.fast is a digital subscriber line (DSL) protocol standard for local loops shorter than 500 meters, with performance targets between 100 Mbit/s and 1 Gbit/s, depending on loop length. High speeds are only achieved over very short loops. Although G.fast was initially designed for loops shorter than 250 meters, Sckipio in early 2015 demonstrated G.fast delivering speeds over 100 Mbit/s at nearly 500 meters and the EU announced a research project.

Formal specifications have been published as ITU-T G.997.2, G.9700, and G.9701, with approval of G.9700 granted in April 2014 and approval of G.9701 granted on December 5, 2014. Development was coordinated with the Broadband Forum's FTTdp (fiber to the distribution point) project.

The letter G in G.fast stands for the ITU-T G series of recommendations; fast is a recursive acronym for fast access to subscriber terminals. Limited demonstration hardware was demonstrated in mid-2013. The first chipsets were introduced in October 2014, with commercial hardware introduced in 2015, and first deployments started in 2016.

== Technology ==
G.fast service is provided to users by DPUs (Distribution Point Units) which are installed near the customer often at a distance of up to 100 meters and connected via optical fiber to an internet service provider. DPUs can be installed in several locations such as multi-dwelling unit basements, utility poles, curb boxes, or manholes, and can be powered by customer premises equipment called NTUs or network termination units, in what is called reverse powering or reverse power feeding.

=== Modulation ===
In G.fast, data is modulated using discrete multi-tone (DMT) modulation, as in VDSL2 and most ADSL variants. G.fast modulates up to 12 bit per DMT frequency carrier, reduced from 15 in VDSL2 for complexity reasons.

The first version of G.fast specifies 106 MHz profiles and the second version specifies 212 MHz profiles, compared to 8.5, 17.664, or 30 MHz profiles in VDSL2. This spectrum overlaps the FM broadcast band between 87.5 and 108 MHz, as well as various military and government radio services. To limit interference to those radio services, the ITU-T G.9700 recommendation, also called G.fast-psd, specifies a set of tools to shape the power spectral density of the transmit signal; G.9701, codenamed G.fast-phy, is the G.fast physical layer specification. To enable co-existence with ADSL2 and the various VDSL2 profiles, the start frequency can be set to 2.2, 8.5, 17.664, or 30 MHz, respectively.

=== Duplex ===
G.fast uses time-division duplexing (TDD), as opposed to ADSL2 and VDSL2, which use frequency-division duplexing. Support for symmetry ratios between 90/10 and 50/50 is mandatory, 50/50 to 10/90 is optional. The discontinuous nature of TDD can be exploited to support low-power states, in which the transmitter and receiver remain disabled for longer intervals than would be required for alternating upstream and downstream operation. This optional discontinuous operation allows a trade-off between throughput and power consumption.

==== GigaDSL ====
GigaDSL is a frequency-division-duplex (FDD) version of G.fast. Qualcomm believes GigaDSL offers a faster upgrade from VDSL in some regions like Korea and Japan. To date, however, it's the only chip supplier backing ITU standardization of GigaDSL. GigaDSL remains a transitional technology, and traditional TDD-based G.fast is expected to dominate larger post-VDSL growth.

=== Channel coding ===
The forward error correction (FEC) scheme using trellis coding and Reed–Solomon coding is similar to that of VDSL2. FEC does not provide good protection against impulse noise. To that end, the impulse noise protection (INP) data unit retransmission scheme specified for ADSL2, ADSL2+, and VDSL2 in G.998.4 is also present in G.fast. To respond to abrupt changes in channel or noise conditions, fast rate adaptation (FRA) enables rapid (<1 ms) reconfiguration of the data rate.

=== Vectoring ===
Performance in G.fast systems is limited to a large extent by crosstalk between multiple wire pairs in a single cable. Self-FEXT (far-end crosstalk) cancellation, also called vectoring, is mandatory in G.fast. Vectoring technology for VDSL2 was previously specified by the ITU-T in G.993.5, also called G.vector. The first version of G.fast will support an improved version of the linear precoding scheme found in G.vector, with non-linear precoding planned for a future amendment. Testing by Huawei and Alcatel shows that non-linear precoding algorithms can provide an approximate data rate gain of 25% compared to linear precoding in very high frequencies; however, the increased complexity leads to implementation difficulties, higher power consumption, and greater costs. Since all current G.fast implementations are limited to 106 MHz, non-linear precoding yields little performance gain. Instead, current efforts to deliver a gigabit are focusing on bonding, power and more bits per hertz.

== Performance ==
In tests performed in July 2013 by Alcatel-Lucent (now Nokia) and Telekom Austria using prototype equipment, aggregate (sum of uplink and downlink) data rates of 1100 Mbit/s were achieved at a distance of 70 m and 800 Mbit/s at a distance of 100 m, in laboratory conditions with a single line. On older, unshielded cable, aggregate data rates of 500 Mbit/s were achieved at 100 m.

Service rate performance targets over 0.5 mm straight loops^{[A]}
Distance	Performance target (Mbit/s)^{[B]}
< 100 m, FTTB	900–2000
100 m	900
200 m	600
300 m	300
500 m	100

^{A} A straight loop is a subscriber line (local loop) without bridge taps.
^{B} The listed values are aggregate (sum of uplink and download) data rates.

== Deployment scenarios ==
The Broadband Forum is investigating architectural aspects of G.fast and has, as of May 2014, identified 23 use cases. Deployment scenarios involving G.fast bring fiber closer to the customer than traditional VDSL2 FTTN (fiber to the node), but not quite to the customer premises as in FTTH (fiber to the home). The term FTTdp (fiber to the distribution point) is commonly associated with G.fast, similar to how FTTN is associated with VDSL2. In FTTdp deployments, a limited number of subscribers at a distance of up to 200–300 m are attached to one fiber node, which acts as DSL access multiplexer (DSLAM). As a comparison, in ADSL2 deployments the DSLAM may be located in a central office (CO) at a distance of up to 5 km from the subscriber, while in some VDSL2 deployments the DSLAM is located in a street cabinet and serves hundreds of subscribers at distances up to 1 km. VDSL2 is also widely used in fiber to the basement.

A G.fast FTTdp fiber node has the approximate size of a large shoebox and can be mounted on a pole or underground. In a FTTB (fiber to the basement) deployment, the fiber node is in the basement of a multi-dwelling unit (MDU) and G.fast is used on the in-building telephone cabling. In a fiber to the front yard scenario, each fiber node serves a single home. The fiber node may be reverse-powered by the subscriber modem. For the backhaul of the FTTdp fiber node, the Broadband Forum's FTTdp architecture provides GPON, XG-PON1, EPON, 10G-EPON, point-to-point fiber Ethernet, and bonded VDSL2 as options. G.Fast was used in the UK before the deployment of faster fiber to the premises services.

Former FCC chief of staff Blair Levin has expressed skepticism that US ISPs have enough incentives to adopt G.fast technology.

== MGfast(G.mgfast/XG-fast/NG-fast) ==
MGfast
- Multi-gigabit fast access to subscriber terminals
- Status: In force
- Year started: 23 April 2021
- First published: 23 April 2021
- Organization: ITU-T
- Base standards: G.997.3; G.9710; G.9711
- Domain: telecommunication
- License: Freely available
- Website: www.itu.int/rec/T-REC-G.997.3/; www.itu.int/rec/T-REC-G.9710/; www.itu.int/rec/T-REC-G.9711/

MGfast is the successor to G.fast. The standard names are ITU-T G.997.3, G.9710, and G.9711. G.9711 was standardized on April 23, 2021.

- The frequency band is 424 MHz, with 848 MHz planned for the future.
- The aggregate bit rate for both uplink and downlink is 8 Gbit/s in Full Duplex (FDX) mode and 4 Gbit/s in Time Division Duplexing (TDD) mode. Full Duplex mode is available on coaxial cables and Category 5 cables, and Time Division Duplexing mode is available on telephone lines.

Before the standardization of MGfast, it was referred to as G.mgfast, XG-fast, and NG-fast.

Bell Labs, Alcatel-Lucent proposed the system concepts of XG-FAST, the 5th generation broadband (5GBB) technology capable of delivering a 10 Gbit/s data rate over short copper pairs. It is demonstrated that multi-gigabit rates are achievable over typical drop lengths of up to 130 m, with net data rates exceeding 10 Gbit/s on the shortest loops. Real-world tests have shown 8 Gbit/s on 30-meter long twisted copper pair lines.

The XG-FAST technology will make fiber-to-the-frontage (FTTF) deployments feasible, which avoids many of the hurdles accompanying a traditional FTTH roll-out. Single subscriber XG-FAST devices would be an integral component of FTTH deployments, and as such help accelerate a worldwide roll-out of FTTH services. Moreover, an FTTF XG-FAST network is able to provide a remotely managed infrastructure and a cost-effective multi-gigabit backhaul for future 5G wireless networks.

ITU-T's new project MGfast (Multi-Gigabit fast) addresses functionality beyond G.fast. Project objectives include:

- Profiles beyond 212 MHz (424 MHz and 848 MHz)
- Full-duplex operation (echo cancelled mode)
- Aggregate data rates of 5 and 10 Gbit/s over single twisted pair and coaxial cable.
- Operation over low quality twisted pair and quad, high quality twisted pair and coaxial cable.

On October 15, 2019, Broadcom announced the BCM65450 series xDSL modems with support for upcoming G.mgfast modes with up to 424 MHz bandwidth.

2021-2031 is the target date range for deployments.

== Terabit DSL (Waveguide over Copper) ==
Beyond MGfast lies a new concept now being studied by a group of Brown University and ASSIA researchers: Waveguide over copper, which enables the Terabit DSL (TDSL). This exploits waveguide transmission modes, in particular transmission modes that are efficiently transported on the surface of a conductor such as copper wire. Waveguide over copper runs at millimeter frequencies (about 30 GHz to 1 THz) and is synergistic with 5G/6G wireless. A type of vectoring is applied to effectively separate the many modes that can propagate within a telephone cable. Preliminary analyses project that waveguide over copper should support about the following per-home data rates:

Distance	Performance target
100 m, FTTB	1 Tbit/s (=1000 Gbit/s)
300 m	100 Gbit/s
500 m	10 Gbit/s

As of 2017, this technology remains an interest of research teams, as a working implementation is yet to be demonstrated.

== G.fast Infrastructure Carriers ==
702 Communications
In 2016, 702 Communications announced that it began deploying G.fast services to multi-dwelling units throughout the Fargo-Moorhead metropolitan area.
Swisscom
On 2016-10-18 Swisscom (Switzerland) Ltd launched G.fast in Switzerland after a more than four-year project phase. In a first step G.fast will be deployed in the FTTdp environment. Swisscom works together with its technology partner Huawei which is the supplier of the G.fast micro-nodes (DSLAMs) that are installed in the manholes.
Frontier Communications
Nokia and Frontier Communications are to deploy G.fast in a pilot program in Connecticut.
M-net Telekommunikations GmbH
The Bavarian operator M-net Telekommunikations GmbH announced on 2017-05-30 that it is launching G.fast services in Munich. M-net claims to be the first carrier running G.fast in Germany, but availability of G.fast data rates remained unavailable to consumers, even two years after the deployment to FTTB households. Rollout eventually started in 2019.
AT&T
On 2017-08-22 AT&T announced it is launching G.fast services in 22 US metro markets.
Openreach

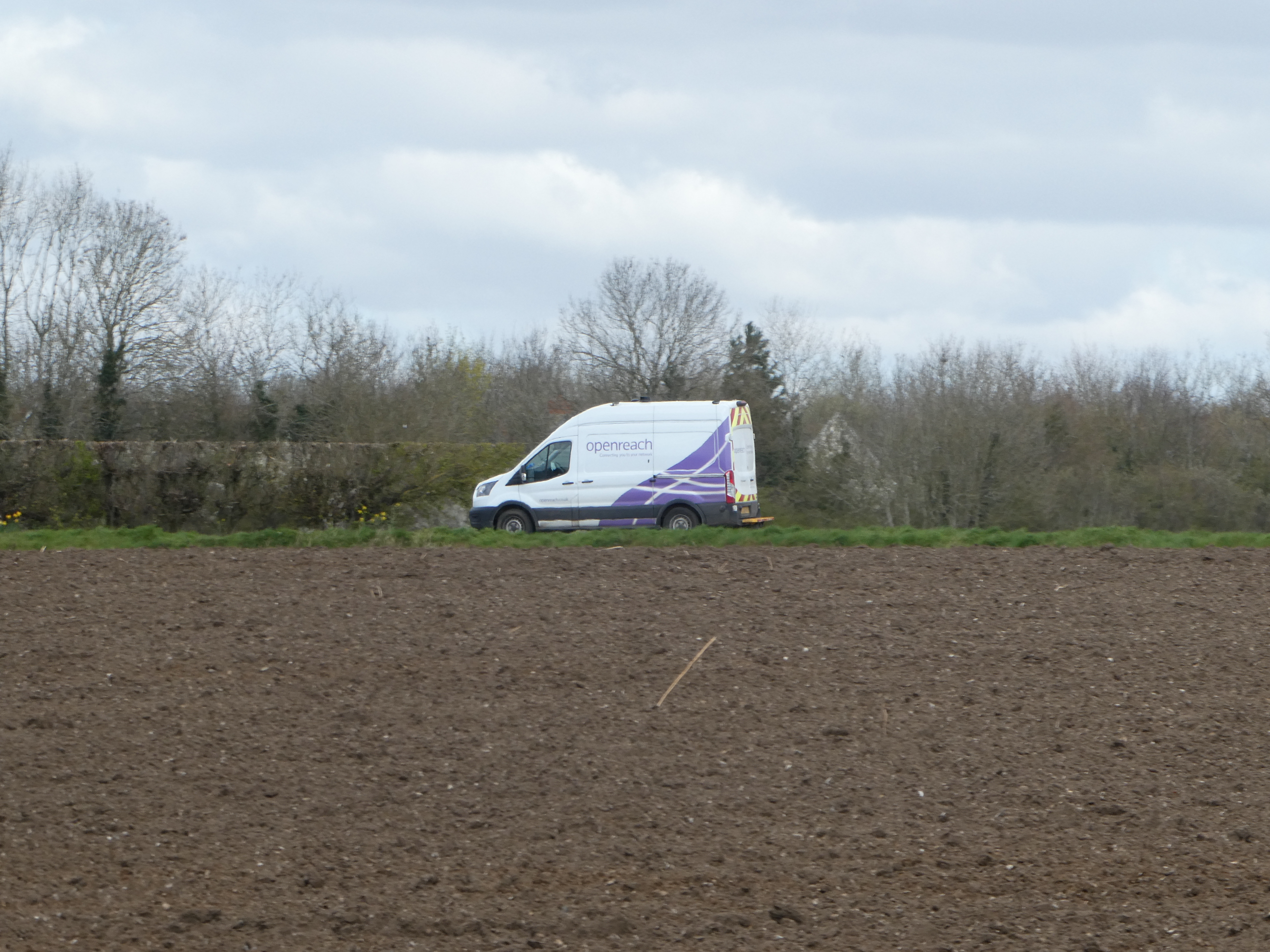
An Openreach van in the UK countryside

On 16 January 2017 Openreach announced it is launching G.fast services to 46 locations in the UK.
On 26 November 2018 Openreach announced it is launching G.fast services to 81 additional locations in the UK.
On 24 June 2020 Openreach announced G.fast deployments will officially remain on pause until at least April 2021, as Fibre to the Premises (FTTP) takes priority. Openreach Confirm G.fast Broadband Rollout Paused Until 2021 UPDATE
CenturyLink
In 2016 CenturyLink announced that it had deployed G.fast to nearly 800 apartments in 44 multi-dwelling units in 2016.
Iskon Internet d.d.
On 21 February 2018 Iskon announced first commercial implementation of G.Fast technology in Croatia, which, with FTTH, enables 200 Mbit/s internet speed in 250,000 Croatian households.
Australia's NBN
In 2018 NBN Co announced that it would deploy G.fast services in future FTTC and FTTB deployments.
Gigacomm
Gigacomm delivers ultra-fast internet speeds up to 10x faster than the Australian download average and has recently launched its services in Sydney and Melbourne.
KDDI
KDDI delivers G.fast connections, marketed as "au Hikari Type G", to apartment buildings in Japan.
