= Reverse power feeding =

Reverse power feeding (RPF) is a technology being standardized by ETSI and the Broadband Forum in 2020. It allows sending power from the customer premises to a distribution point (DP), in order to power the distribution point unit (DPU). The DPU includes typically a DSL access multiplexer (DSLAM) that can support up to 24 users and an optical network terminator (ONT), which connects the DPU to a central office (CO) where the optical line terminator (OLT) is located. This topology is also known as fiber to the distribution point (FTTdp). RPF is a critical technology for the upgrade of VDSL2 subscribers to the new G.fast standard, which has a maximum range (at high speeds) of 250m. Given that only a small number of subscribers is located at a radius of 250m from a DPU, the number of DPUs required to deploy G.fast infrastructure greatly increases, compared to VDSL2 and older xDSL technologies. RPF reduces installation cost by removing the need to connect the DPU locally to the power grid, as well as the need to monitor its power consumption with a smart meter.

Unlike PoE, which defines worst case power losses on a cable that is well defined, RPF defines a maximum safety power envelope, and allows implementations to squeeze as much power as possible from the line. This important difference comes from the fact that PoE was defined with enterprise networks in mind (where the maker of the powered device (PD) needs to interoperate with any power sourcing equipment (PSE)), while RPF is defined for networks that are closed by nature, deployed by a service provider.
