= Interface functionality =

Characteristic of interfaces that allows operators to support transmission

In telephony, interface functionality is the characteristic of interfaces that allows operators to support transmission, switching, and signaling functions identical to those used in the enhanced services provided by the carrier.

As part of its comparably efficient interconnection (CEI) offering, the carrier must make available standardized telephone networking hardware and software interfaces that are able to support transmission, switching, and signaling functions identical to those used in the enhanced services provided by the carrier.
