= COSMOS (telecommunications) =

COSMOS (Computer System for Main Frame Operations) was a record-keeping system for main distribution frames (MDFs) in the Bell System, the American Bell Telephone Company and then, subsequently, AT&T–led system which provided telephone services to much of the United States and Canada from 1977 to 1984.

COSMOS was introduced in the 1970s after MDFs were found to be congested in large urban telephone exchanges. It assigns terminals so jumpers need not be so long, thus leaving more space on the shelves. COSMOS also converts customer service orders into printed work orders for staff who connect the jumpers. COSMOS orders are usually coordinated with RCMAC to ensure that translations match wiring. With good computer records, jumpers are often left in place for reuse when one customer replaces another, resulting in a great reduction in labor.

More modern modular MDFs were developed around the same time called COSMIC (Common System Main Interconnecting) frames.

== See also ==
- Operations support systems
