= Heat coil =

Surge protectors between a telephone exchange and outside plant

Heat coils, also known as protectors, bugs or carbons serve as a surge protector between the telephone exchange and outside plant. They are commonly the last point of appearance for a telephone circuit before it leaves the office, for example on the outside plant side of the main distribution frame. On some competitive local exchange carrier circuits there are two heat coils, the extra one being at the point of interface between their circuit and where the incumbent local exchange carrier or Regional Bell Operating Company receives it. Their primary purpose is to protect central office equipment from surges of high voltage.

If a surge comes down the line it will melt the connection between the central office and outside plant sides, as in a fuse, thereby protecting the equipment. Some heat coils have springs in them, so that when a surge breaks the circuit their tension is released and the plastic cover pops off as a visual indicator that the line is somehow defective.

This image from The Bell System technical journal provides a technical schematic and description of 'a heat coil used to protect telephone exchange equipment against excessive electrical currents that may accidentally come in over the line wires.'
