= Ringer equivalence number =

Indication of the electrical load on a telephone line

The ringer equivalence number (REN) is a telecommunications measure that represents the electrical loading effect of a telephone ringer on a telephone line. In the United States, ringer equivalence was first defined by U.S. Code of Federal Regulations, Title 47, Part 68, based on the load that a standard Bell System model 500 telephone represented, and was later determined in accordance with specification ANSI/TIA-968-B (August 2009). Measurement systems analogous to the REN exist internationally.

== Definition ==
The ringer equivalence of 1 represents the loading effect of a single traditional telephone ringing circuit, such as that within the Western Electric model 500 telephone. The ringer equivalence of modern telephone equipment may be significantly lower than 1. For example, externally powered electronic ringing telephones may have a value as low as 0.1, while modern line-powered telephones, in which the ringer is powered from the telephone line, typically have a REN of approximately 0.8.

In the United States, the FCC Part 68 specification defined REN 1 as equivalent to a 6930 Ω resistor in series with an 8μF (microfarad) capacitor. The modern ANSI/TIA-968-B specification (August 2009) defines it as an impedance of 7000Ω at 20Hz (type A ringer), or 8000Ω from 15Hz to 68Hz (type B ringer).

== Maximum ringer equivalence ==
The total ringer load on a subscriber line is the sum of the ringer equivalences of all devices (phone, fax, a separate answerphone, etc.) connected to the line. This represents the overall loading effect of the subscriber equipment on the central office ringing current source. Subscriber telephone lines are usually limited to support a ringer equivalence of 5, per the federal specifications.

If the total allowable ringer load is exceeded, the phone circuit may fail to ring or otherwise malfunction. For example, call waiting, caller ID, and ADSL services are often affected by high ringer load.

Some analog telephone adapters for Internet telephony require analog telephones with low REN, for example, the AT&T 210 is a basic phone which does not require an external electrical connection and has a REN of 0.9B.

== International specifications ==
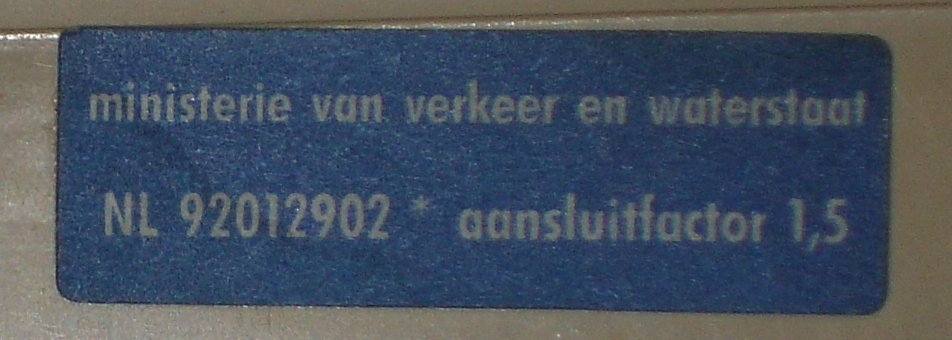
In the Netherlands all telephone equipment shall carry a blue label with the ringer equivalence number - in this case 1.5

In the United Kingdom a maximum of 4 is allowed on any British Telecom (BT) line.

In Australia a maximum of 3 is allowed on any Telstra or Optus Line.

In Canada it is called a load number (LN); which must not exceed 100. The LN of each device represents the percentage of total load allowed.

In Europe 1 REN used to be equivalent to an 1800 Ω resistor in series with a 1 μF capacitor. The latest ETSI specification (2003–09) calls for 1 REN to be greater than 16 kΩ at 25 Hz and 50 Hz.
