= Tandem signaling =

Tandem signaling is the two-step conversion of a digital signal into an analog signal, followed by the reverse conversion. While there is a universal standard for analog signal transmission, digital signals may employ a variety of sampling rates and encoding methods (codecs). Any differences in sampling rate or encoding between transmitter and receiver introduce errors or artifacts in the resulting signal. When speech is being transmitted, as in audio telephone calls, tandem signaling may produce unintelligible results. Tandem signaling is an important evaluation criterion in the evaluation of speech coders.

== Background ==
Mobile telephones use digital signals, while landlines terminate in analog signal systems. For historical reasons, mobile phone calls that cross network or carrier boundaries use an analog network backbone and are converted from digital to analog signals on one network and converted back to digital signals on the receiving network.

== Bit-rates ==
If one phone uses a high-bitrate codec, and the other a low-bitrate, the user with the high bitrate will be able to hear the user with the low bitrate, but possibly not the reverse.

Even if all phones used the same audio codec, packet retransmission and re-encoding are still required. When a user makes a call to a POTS phone, the audio is digitized into packets that are transmitted from the mobile device and are then decoded into 64 kbit/s PCM. This creates little extra noise, and if the mobile signal strength is sufficient, the user on the POTS line will be able to carry on a conversation.
