= Rural radio service =

Rural radiotelephone service (RRTS) provides basic, analog communications service between locations deemed so remote that traditional wireline service or service by other means is not feasible. RRTS uses channelized radio to provide radiotelephone services such as Basic Exchange Telephone Radio Service between a fixed subscriber location and a remote central office, private line service between a two fixed locations or interconnection between two or more central offices. RRTS does not enable mobile communications.

== Licensing ==
In the United States, the Federal Communications Commission issues initial rural radiotelephone service licenses on a site-by-site basis. Once a license is issued, the licensee can sell or lease the license to another party.

The FCC service rules for rural radiotelephone are filed in 47 C.F.R. part 22 subpart F.

== Technical information ==
In the United States, the ULS radio service code and description for rural radiotelephone licenses is CR – Rural Radiotelephone. The licensed spectrum is divided in 44 channels of 20 kHz each.
