= Wireless Telephony Applications Interface =

The Wireless Telephone Applications Interface (WTAI) is a protocol used in conjunction with the Wireless Application Protocol (WAP) to allow a phone number to be linked to a web page.
