= Inside plant =

In telecommunications, the term inside plant has the following meanings:

- All the cabling and equipment installed in a telecommunications facility, including the main distribution frame (MDF) and all the equipment extending inward therefrom, such as PABX or central office equipment, MDF heat coil protectors, and grounding systems.
- In radio and radar systems, all communications-electronics (C-E) equipment that is installed in buildings.

Around the turn of the 21st century, DSLAMs became an important part of telephone company inside plant. Inside plant will also have distribution frames and other equipment including passive optical network (name depends on the Service Provider).

== Power ==
A typical power system for a switching office in an inside plant consists of the elements listed below:

- AC power system
  - AC input switch gear
  - Standby AC plant (where appropriate)
  - AC distribution system (essential and non-essential loads)
  - AC backup systems for uninterruptible loads and protected loads
- DC power system
  - Rectifiers and plant controls
  - Storage batteries
  - DC distribution system.

For safety and reliability reasons, it is desirable that all telecommunications loads be DC powered with minimal AC-powered devices used. Telcordia GR-513, Power Requirements in Telecommunications Plant (LSSGR Section 13), contains detailed industry requirements for using power in an inside plant.

Both integrated and isolated bonding networks as per Telcordia GR-295, Mesh and Isolated Bonding Networks: Definition and Application to Telephone Central Offices, are a technically viable means to ground and bond the equipment in a safe and effective manner. However, the integrated or mesh bonding schemes are preferred over isolated bonding networks because of the added costs and efforts required to manage, control, and maintain the isolation for the equipment, particularly during equipment upgrade and modifications to the plant. This preference is based on a pragmatic desire for lower costs and ease of management, and to simplify operations during plant modifications/upgrades.

For a comprehensive analysis of the energy efficiency and environmental soundness of a power system, one should ideally consider a wider range of factors than strict energy conversion AC-to-DC power efficiency. These environmental factors cover a wider vision known as Industrial Ecology within which each manufacturing step of the products need to be considered from a Design for Environment (DfE) factors standpoint.

== See also ==
- Outside plant

== Sources ==
- This article incorporates public domain material from Federal Standard 1037C. General Services Administration. Archived from the original on 22 January 2022. (in support of MIL-STD-188).
