= Distribution frame =

Location at which telecommunications cables interconnect

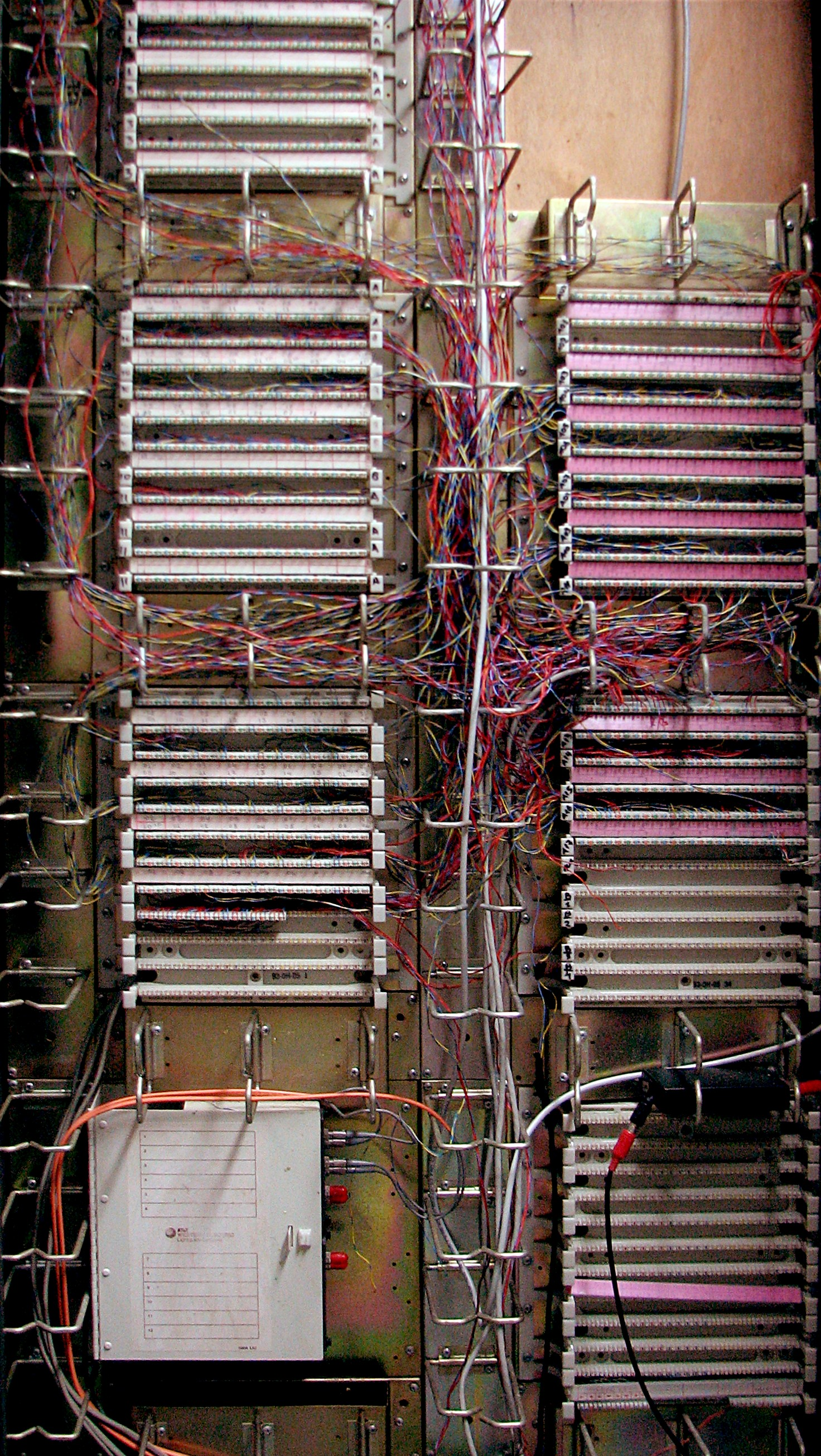
Unshielded twisted pair (copper) and optical fiber distribution frame

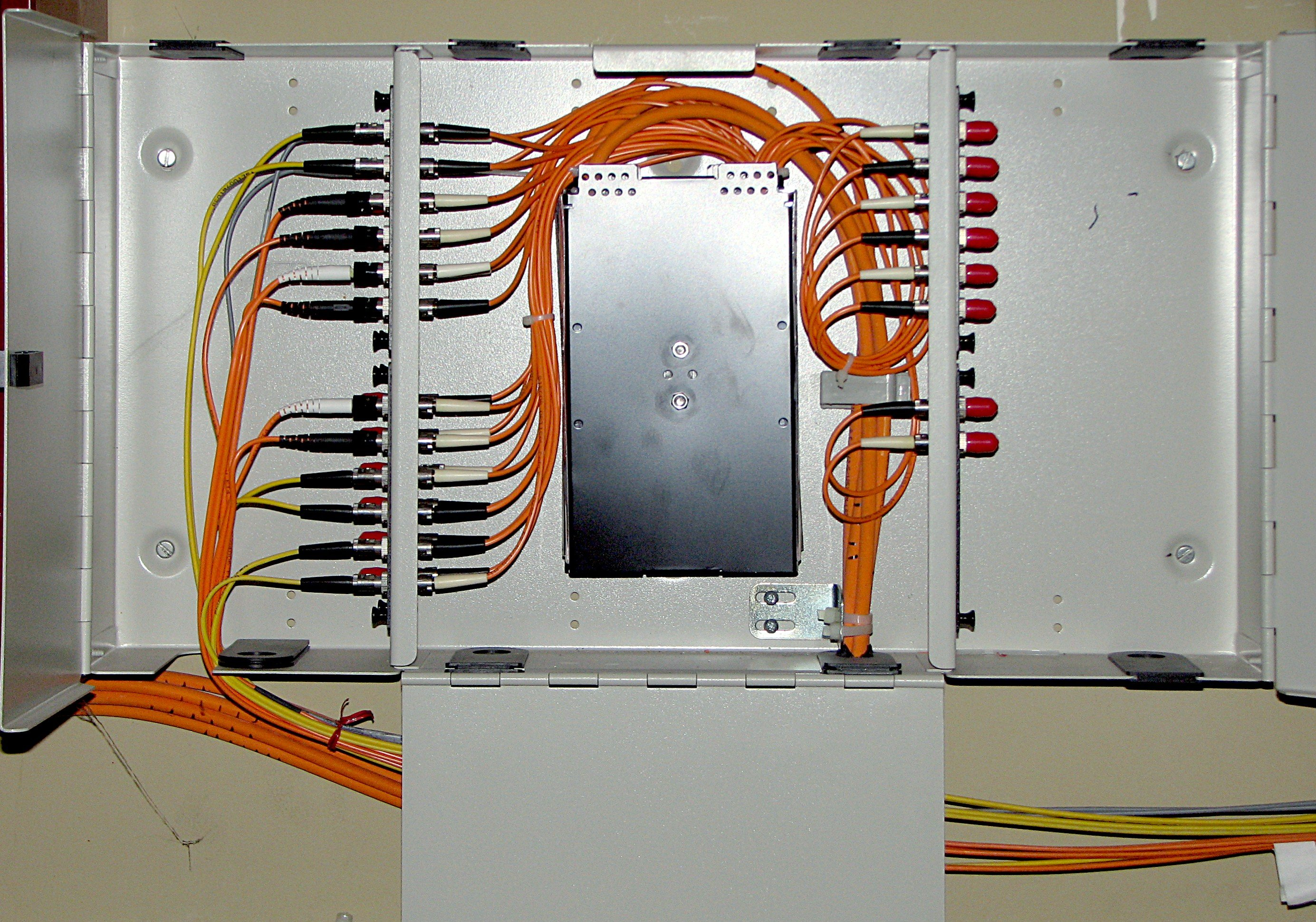
An optical fiber distribution frame

In telecommunications, a distribution frame is a passive device which terminates cables, allowing arbitrary interconnections to be made.

For example, the main distribution frame (MDF) located at a telephone central office terminates the cables leading to subscribers on the one hand, and cables leading to active equipment (such as DSLAMs and telephone switches) on the other. Service is provided to a subscriber by manually wiring a twisted pair (called a jumper wire) between the telephone line and the relevant DSL or POTS line circuit.

In broadcast engineering, a distribution frame is a location within an apparatus room through which all signals (audio, video, or data) pass, with the ability to arbitrarily route and connect sources and destinations between studios and other internal and external points. Connections can either be soldered, or made using terminal blocks. Because the frame may carry live broadcast signals, it may be considered part of the airchain.

In data communication, a building distribution frame (BDF) houses data switches, etc.

== Types ==
Distribution frames for specific types of signals often have specific initialisms:

- DDF – digital distribution frame
- IDF – Intermediate distribution frame
- MDF – Main distribution frame
- ODF or OFDF – optical fiber distribution frame
- VDF – voice distribution frame

== Modernization ==
Distribution frames may grow to extremely large sizes. In major installations, audio distribution frames can have as many as 10,000 incoming and outgoing separate copper wires (balanced audio signals require two wires plus earth ground for each signal). Telephone signals do not use a separate earth ground wire, but some urban exchanges have about 250,000 wires on their MDF. Installing and rewiring these jumpers is a labour-intensive task, leading to attempts in the industry to devise so-called active distribution frames or Automated Main Distribution Frames. The principal issues which stand in the way of their widespread adoption are cost and reliability.

Newer digital mixing consoles can act as control points for a distribution frame or router, which can handle audio from multiple studios (even for multiple co-located radio or TV stations) at the same time. Multiple smaller frames, such as one for each studio, can be linked together with fibre-optics (which also helps eliminate ground loops), or with gigabit Ethernet. This has the advantage of not having to route dozens of feeds through walls (and sometimes floors and ceilings) to a single point.

== See also ==
- 66 block – Table used to physically connect phone lines
- Patch panel – Device featuring a number of jacks for connecting and routing circuits
- Splicebox
- Wiring closet – room used for communications and/or electrical infrastructure
