= Main distribution frame =

Distribution frame where cables are cross-connected in telephony

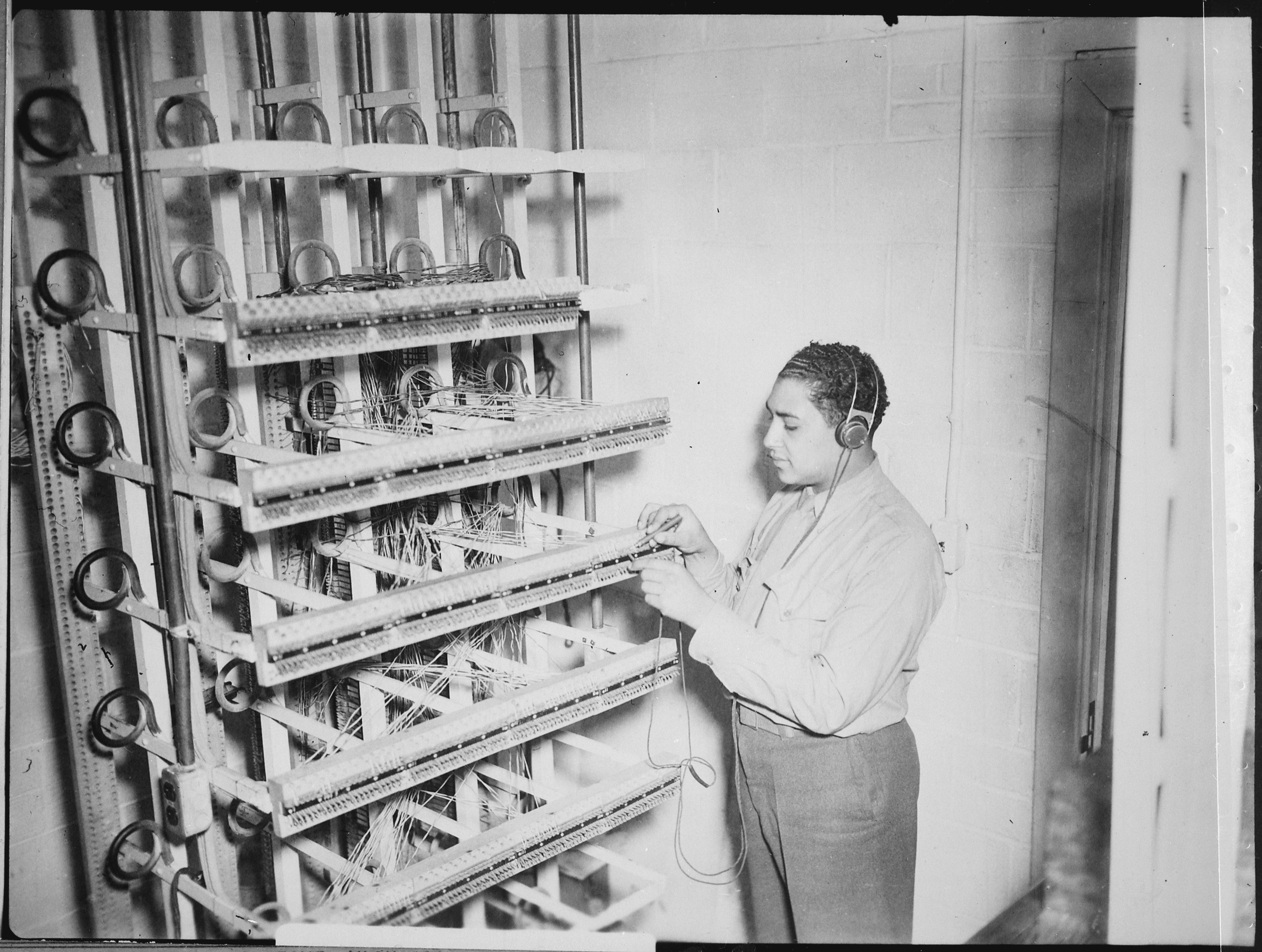
Small, single-sided MDF for a military base, 1940s

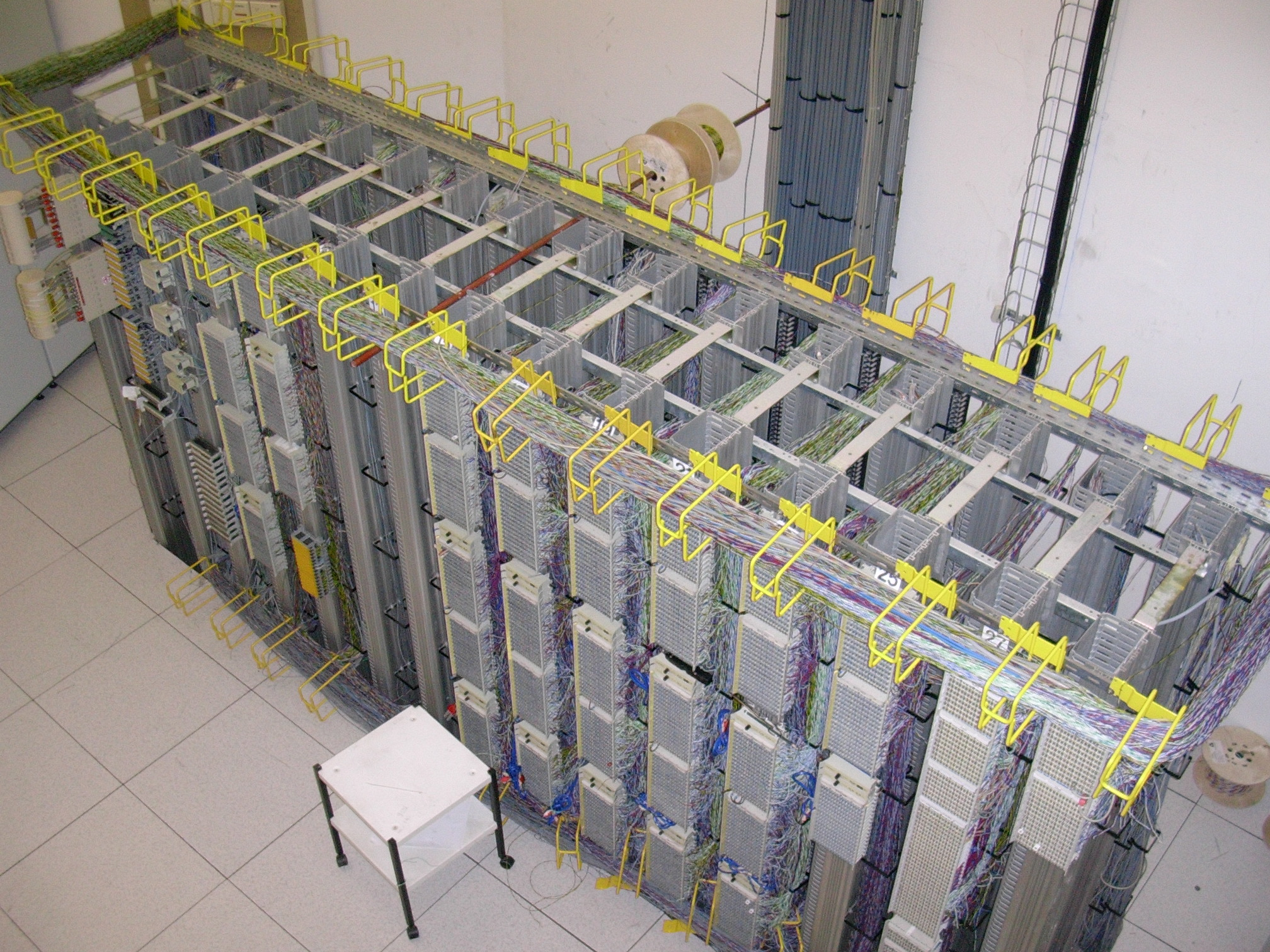
Modern main distribution frame

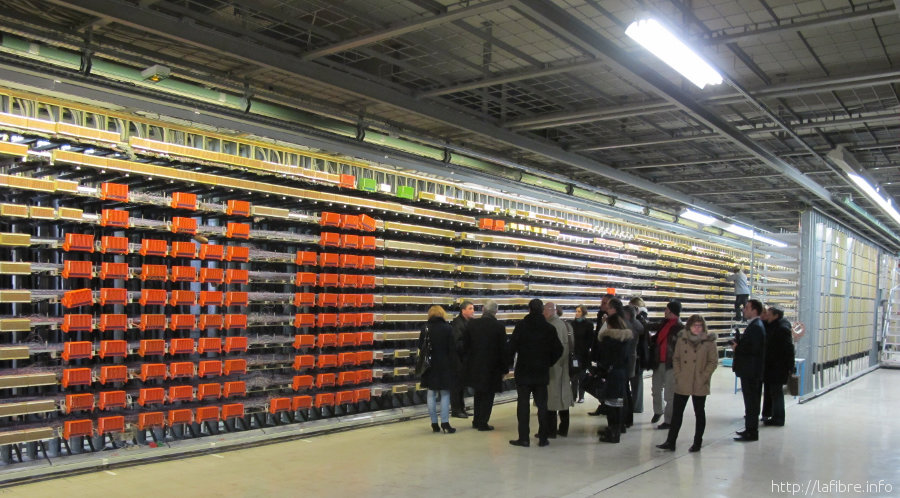
MDF at a central office with capacity for 67,000 users

In telephony, a main distribution frame (MDF or main frame) is a signal distribution frame for connecting equipment (inside plant) to cables and subscriber carrier equipment (outside plant).

The MDF is a termination point within the local telephone exchange where exchange equipment and terminations of local loops are connected by jumper wires at the MDF. All cable copper pairs supplying services through user telephone lines are terminated at the MDF and distributed through the MDF to equipment within the local exchange e.g. repeaters and DSLAM. Cables to intermediate distribution frames (IDF) terminate at the MDF. Trunk cables may terminate on the same MDF or on a separate trunk main distribution frame (TMDF).

Like other distribution frames the MDF provides flexibility in assigning facilities, at lower cost and higher capacity than a patch panel.

== Operation ==
The most common kind of large MDF is a long steel rack accessible from both sides. On one side, termination blocks are arranged horizontally at the front of rack shelves. Jumpers lie on the shelves and go through an insulated steel hoop to run vertically to other termination blocks that are arranged vertically. There is a hoop or ring at the intersection of each level and each vertical. Installing a jumper historically required two workers, one on either side of the MDF. The shelves are shallow enough to allow the rings to be within arm's reach, but the workers prefer to hang the jumper on a hook on a pole so their partner can pull it through the ring. A fanning strip at the back of each termination block prevents the wires from covering each other's terminals. With disciplined administration, the MDF can hold over a hundred thousand jumpers, with dozens changed every day, for decades without tangling.

The MDF usually holds telephone exchange protective devices including heat coils, and functions as a test point between a line and the exchange equipment.

== History ==
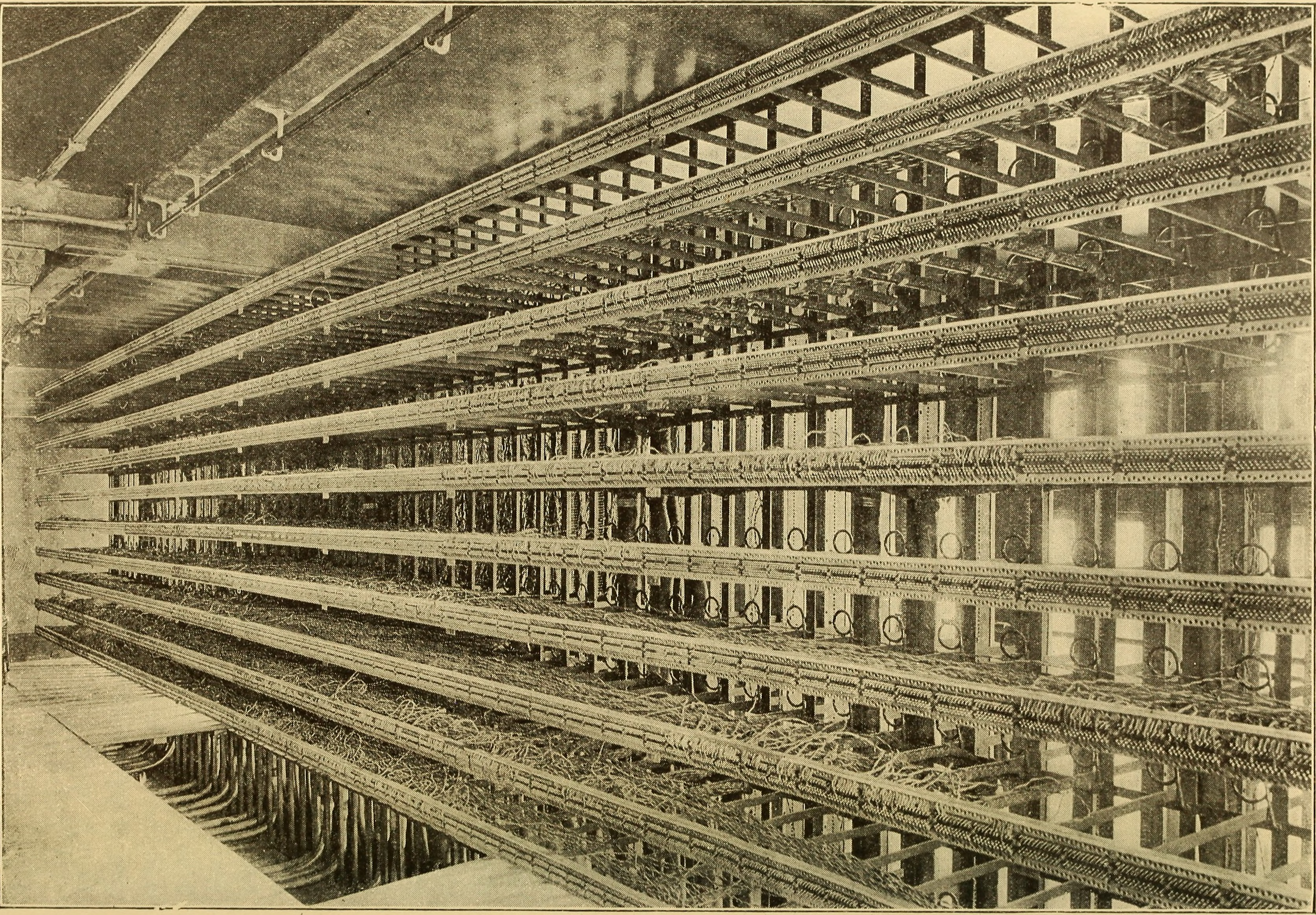
MDF newly installed in a large urban exchange, early 20th century, no jumpers yet

Before 1960, MDF jumpers were generally soldered. This was reliable but slow and expensive. Wire wrap was introduced in the 1960s, and punch blocks in the 1970s. In the early 21st century most exchanges in the UK, still used soldered blocks but were being slowly phased out.

Each jumper is a twisted pair. Middle 20th century jumper wires in the USA were 24 AWG single strand copper, with a soft polyethylene inner jacket and a cotton wrapper, impregnated to make it slightly brittle and easy to remove neatly. Late 20th century ones had a single, thicker coating of polyethylene cross-linked to provide a suitable degree of brittleness.

Some urban telephone exchange MDFs are two stories high so they do not have to be more than a city block long. A few are three stories. Access to the upper levels can be either by a traveling ladder attached to the MDF, or by mezzanine walkways at a suitable height. By British custom the cables to the outside world are terminated on the horizontal side, and the indoors equipment on the vertical side. American usage is the opposite.

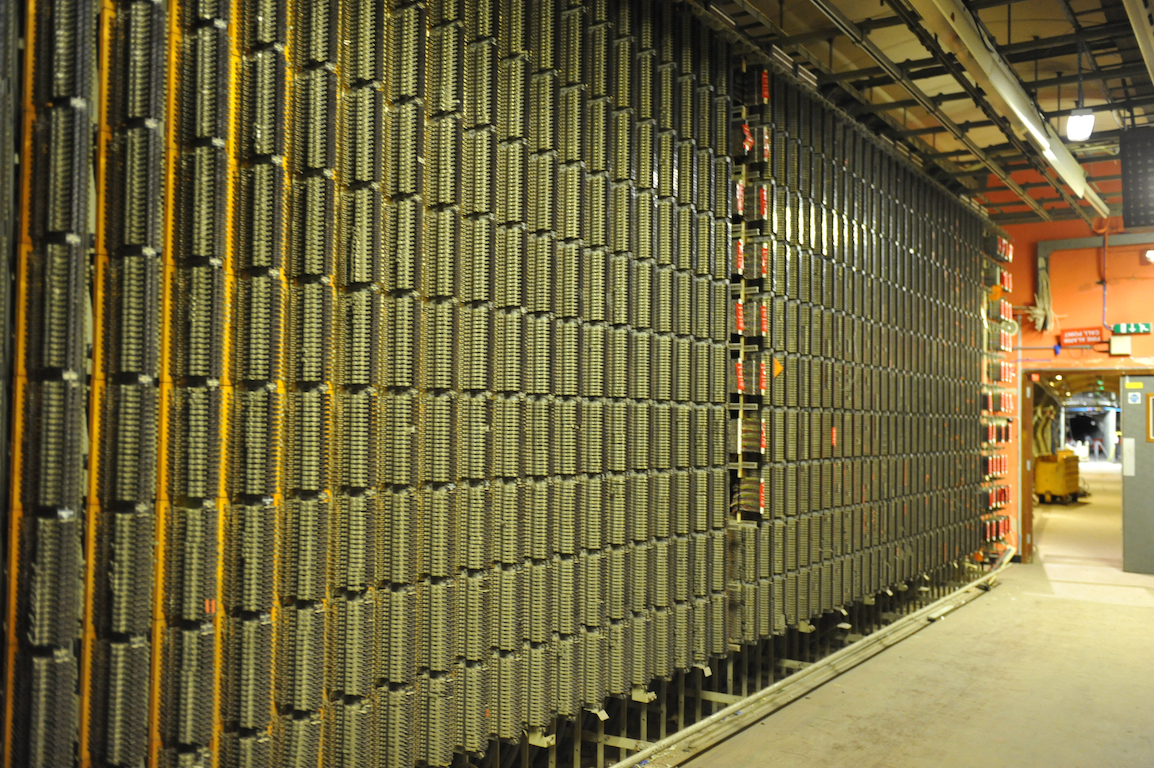
Obsolete MDF in a cold-war era telephone exchange

Smaller MDFs, and some modern large ones, are single sided so one worker can install, remove or change a jumper. COSMOS and other computerized Operations Support Systems help by assigning terminals close to one another, so most jumpers need not be long and shelves on either type of MDF do not become congested. This database keeps track of all terminals and jumpers. In the early and middle 20th century these records were kept as pencil entries in ledger books. The later database method saves much labor by permitting old jumpers to be reused for new lines.

The adoption of distributed switching in the late 20th century diminished the need for large, active, central MDFs.

Sometimes the MDF is combined with other kinds of distribution frame in a CDF.

The MDF in a private branch exchange performs functions similar to those performed by the MDF in a central office.

Automated Main Distribution Frame (AMDF) has been a subject of experiments.

== See also ==
- Distribution frame
- Intermediate distribution frame for more about vertical and horizontal main distribution frames
- Combined distribution frames serve more than one purpose
