= Demarcation point =

Boundary of a private and public network

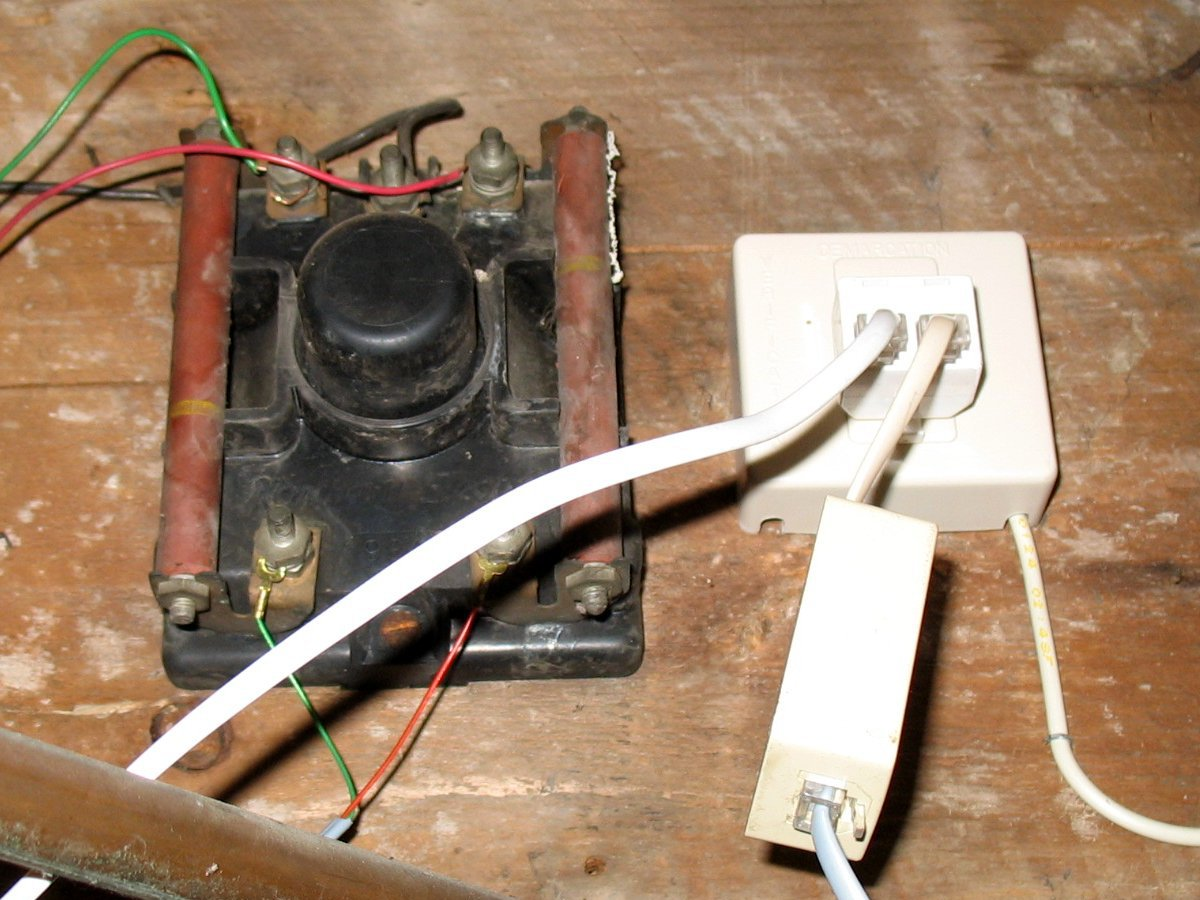
Old and new style demarcation points in a Canadian home built in 1945. A line splitter has been plugged into the modern demarc on the right. From this junction, one line passes through a DSL filter before going to the old demarc, and from there to the remainder of the house; the other connection may be run to the subscriber’s DSL modem.

In telephony, the demarcation point is the point at which the public switched telephone network ends and connects with the customer's on-premises wiring. It is the dividing line which determines who is responsible for installation and maintenance of wiring and equipment—customer/subscriber, or telephone company/provider. The demarcation point varies between countries and has changed over time.

Demarcation point is sometimes abbreviated as demarc, DMARC, or similar. The term MPOE (minimum or main point of entry) is synonymous, with the added implication that it occurs as soon as possible upon entering the customer premises. A network interface device often serves as the demarcation point.

== History ==
Prior to Federal Communications Commission (FCC) regulations separating the ownership of customer premises telecommunication equipment from the telephone network, there was no need for a public standard governing the interconnection of customer premises equipment (CPE) to the United States' telephone network, since both the devices and the “local loop” wiring to the central office were owned and maintained by the local telephone company. Concurrent with the transfer of existing "embedded" CPE to the customer (customers could buy new telephones at retail or could continue to lease their existing equipment from the company), it was necessary to provide a standardized way to connect equipment, and also provide a way to test the phone company's service separately from the customer's equipment.

The ability of customers to buy and maintain their CPE and attach it to the network was stimulated by lawsuits by equipment manufacturers, such as the Hush-a-Phone v. FCC suit. Additionally, computer companies’ ability to offer enhanced services to customers was likewise constrained by the telephone companies’ control of all devices connected to the network. As the Bell telephone companies were themselves restricted from offering such enhanced services, there was little momentum to advance the state of the art.

The newly developed equipment-network separation was codified in Part 68 of the Code of Federal Regulations in the United States and later in comparable regulatory standards in other countries.

The physical and electrical interconnection is called the demarcation point, or Demarc, which includes one or more customer-accessible jack interfaces; previously, the interface was typically hard-wired and often in a telephone company-owned locked enclosure.

The premises-vs.-network separation in the United States, insofar as it affected the former Bell System, was independent of AT&T's divestiture of the local telephone companies on January 1, 1984. However, CPE interconnection and Bell System divestiture were part of a larger restructuring of the domestic telecommunications industry which took place during the 1980s and are commonly, if inaccurately, seen as one event. The historical Bell System domination of the United States telecommunications industry was also the de facto standard for other telephone companies such as GTE and other “independent” telephone companies.

== Equipment ==
=== Canada ===
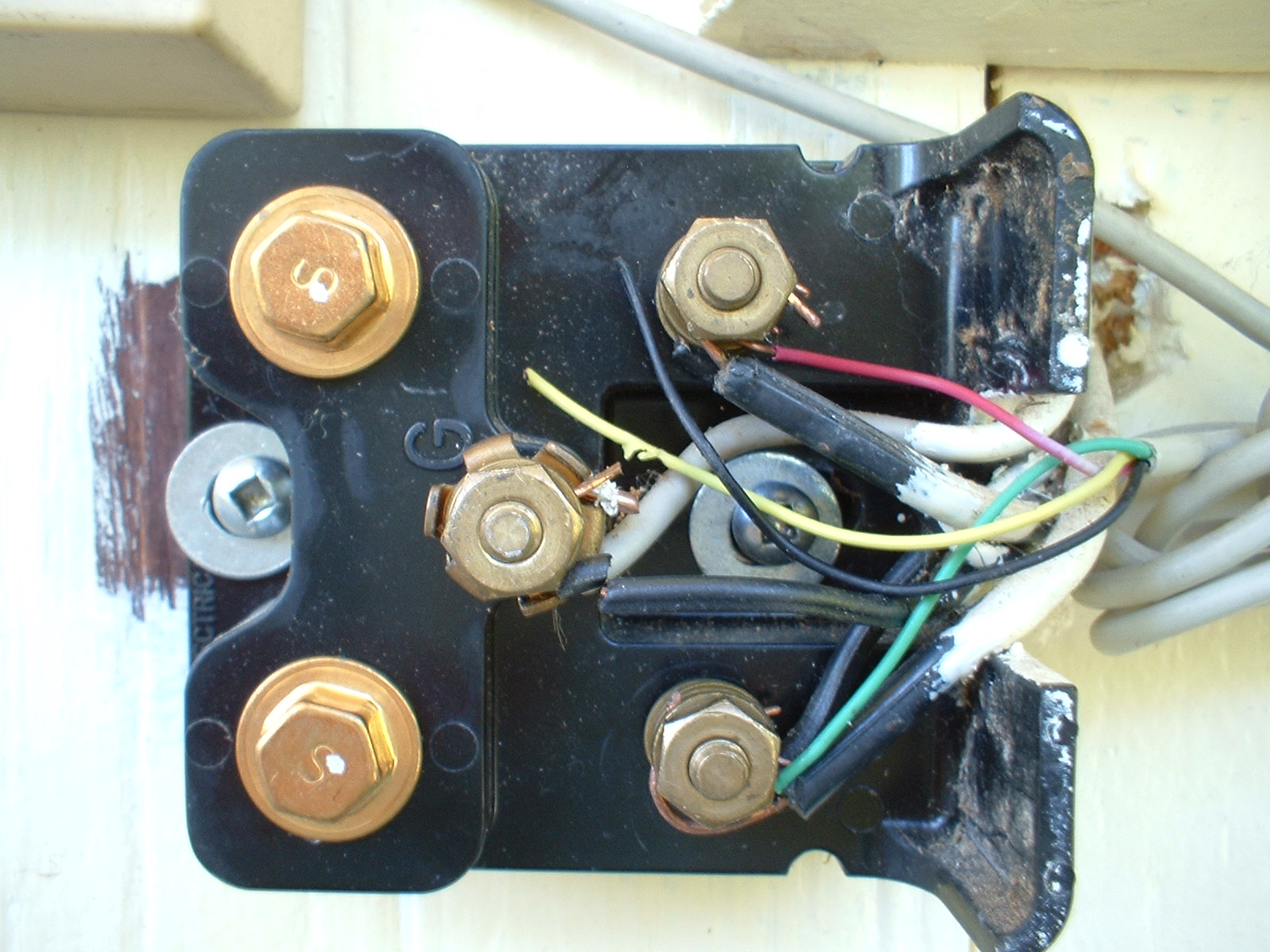
20th century Bell Canada demarcation point for a single phone line. The spark-gap surge protectors on the left have hex heads for easy removal. Near center, a post is connected to the house's ground. The other two connection points are for tip and ring. A test jack can be attached nearby so the home-owner or tenant can verify whether the inside wiring is at fault. Modern Bell Canada demarcation points are network interface devices.

The demarcation point varies from building type and service level. In its simplest form, the demarcation point is a junction block where telephone extensions join to connect to the network. This junction block usually includes a lightning arrester (which requires a wire to ground). In multi-line installations such as businesses or apartment buildings, the demarcation point may be a punch down block. In most places this hardware existed before deregulation.

=== United States ===
In the United States, the modern demarcation point is a device defined by FCC rules (47 C.F.R. Part 68) to allow safe connection of third-party telephone customer-premises equipment and wiring to the Public Switched Telephone Network (PSTN).

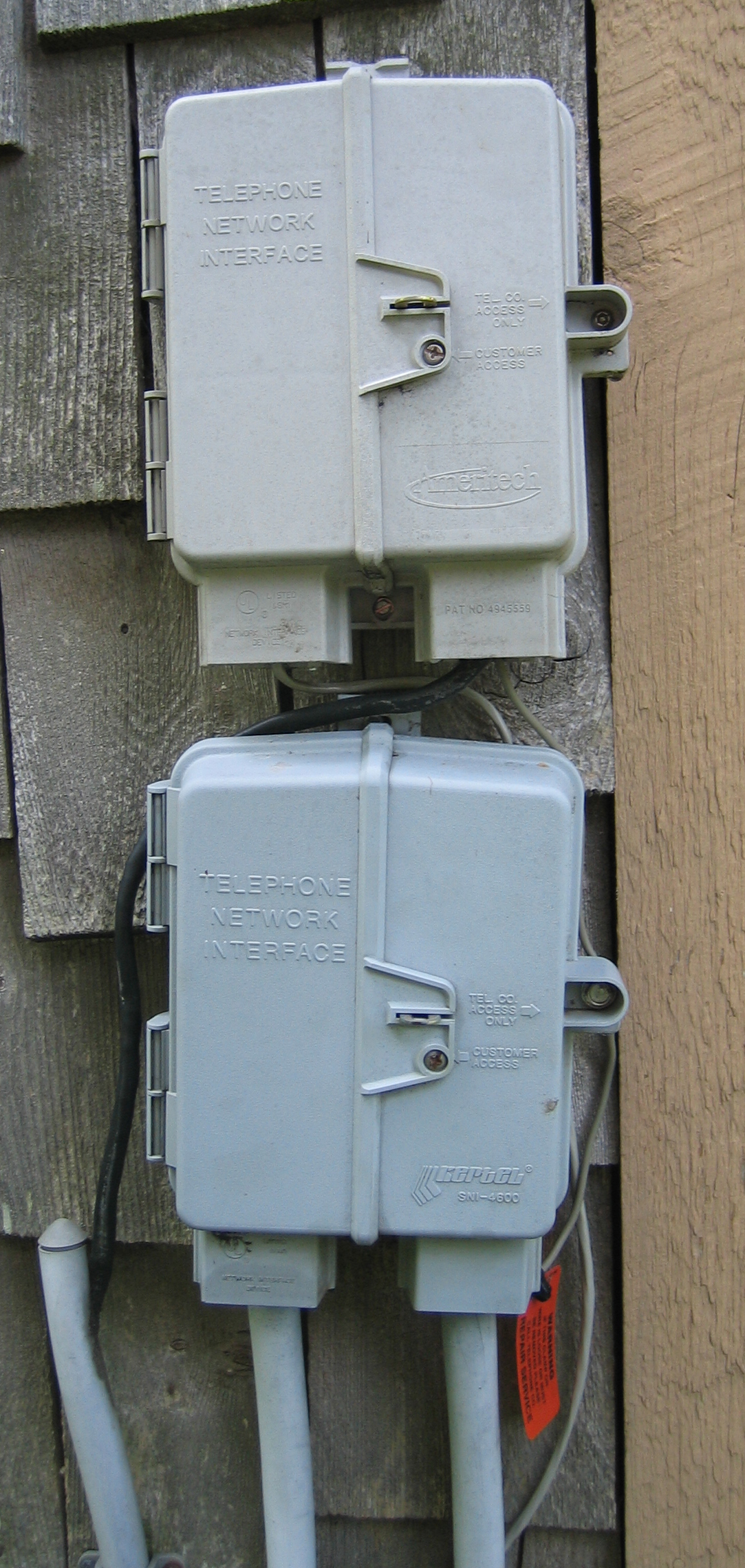
Two network interface devices

The modern demarcation point is the network interface device (NID) or intelligent network interface device (INID) also known as a "smartjack". The NID is the telco's property. The NID may be outdoors (typically, mounted on the building exterior in a weatherproof box) or indoors.

The NID is usually placed for easy access by a technician. It also contains a lightning arrestor, fuse and test circuitry which allows the carrier to remotely test whether a wiring fault lies in the customer premises or in the carrier wiring, without requiring a technician at the premises. The demarcation point has a user accessible RJ-11 jack (a "test jack" or "demarcation jack"), which is connected directly to the telephone network, and a small loop of telephone cord connecting to the jack by a modular connector.

When the loop is disconnected, the on-premises wiring is isolated from the telephone network and the customer may directly connect a telephone to the network via the jack to assist in determining the location of a wiring fault. In most cases, everything from the central office to and including the demarcation point is owned by the carrier and everything past it is owned by the property owner.

As the local loop becomes upgraded, with fiber optic and coaxial cable technologies sometimes replacing the original unshielded twisted pair to the premises, the demarcation point has grown to incorporate the equipment necessary to interface the original premises POTS wiring and equipment to the new communication channel.

Demarcation points on houses built prior to the Bell System divestiture usually do not contain a test jack. They only contained a spark-gap surge protector, a grounding post and mount point to connect a single telephone line. The second wire pair was usually left unconnected and were kept as a spare pair in case the first pair was damaged.

DEMARCs that handle both telephony and IT fiber optic internet lines often do not look like the ones pictured above. In many places several customers share one central DEMARC for a commercial or strip mall setting. Usually a DEMARC will be located indoors if it is serving more than a single customer. This may impede access. Outdoor ones provide easier access, without disturbing other tenants, but call for weatherproofing and punching through a wall for each new addition of wires and service.

Typically indoor DEMARC's will be easily identified by a patch panel of telephone wires on the wall next to a series of boxes with RJ48 jacks for T-1 lines. Each business or individual customer can expect their own separate box for internet access T-1 lines.

==== Demarcation point extension ====
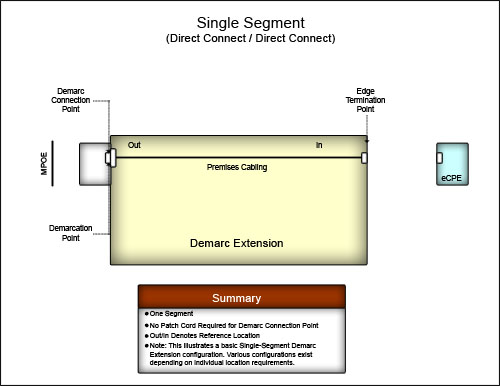
Demarcation point extension

A demarcation point extension, or demarc extension is the transmission path originating from the interface of the access provider's side of a demarcation point within a premises and ending at the termination point prior to the interface of the edge Customer Premises Equipment (CPE). This may include in-segment equipment, media converters and patch cords as required to complete the circuit's transmission path to the edge CPE. A demarc extension is more correctly termed "Service Interface Extension", and may also be referred to as inside wiring, extended demarc, circuit extension, CPE cabling, riser cabling or DMARC extension.

A demarc extension became an important factor to consider in a building's telecommunications infrastructure after the 1984 deregulation of AT&T as well as the supplemental FCC rulings of 1991, 1996 and 1997. Preceding these rulings, the Bell System Companies held a monopoly and did not allow an interconnection with third party equipment. The incumbent local exchange carriers (ILEC) and other local access providers are now mandated by federal law to provide a point where the operational control or ownership changes. This separation between the local access provider and the end user/subscriber is called the demarcation point within a facility (typically a short distance from the minimum point of entry). This then becomes the responsibility of the end user to extend their service to the CPE location within a facility to provide connectivity for service, requiring a service interface extension, or otherwise called a demarc extension.

=== United Kingdom ===
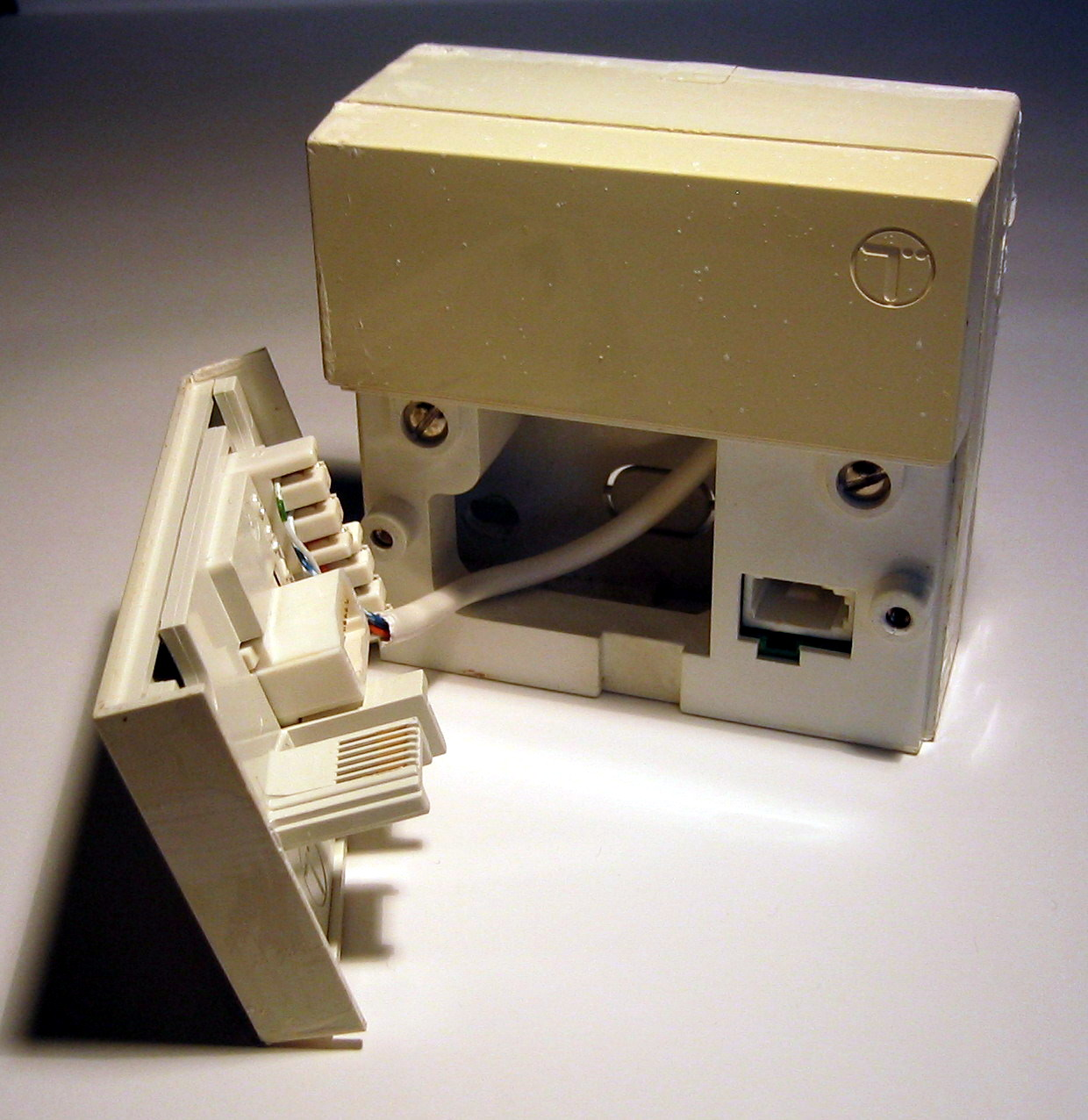
A British Telecom NTE5 master socket, showing the removable front plate and test socket

In the United Kingdom, the demarcation point occurs on the LJU master socket, whose wiring is partly owned by the customer, partly owned by the phone company. Other secondary sockets are the customer's property. Newer NTE-5 master phone sockets have a removable front panel: the front panel and its wiring is the customer's, while the rear wiring is Openreach's.

The removable panel allows separation of these two parts and independent maintenance, and access to a test socket to determine whether line faults are in the customer's wiring or Openreach's (formerly BT's) external network.

== See also ==
- 66 block
- 110 block
- Carterfone
- Customer-premises equipment
- Hush-A-Phone Corp. v. United States
- Interconnection
- Main distribution frame
- Network interface device
- On-premises wiring
- Service termination point
