= Wiring closet =

Room or enclosure for wiring and equipment

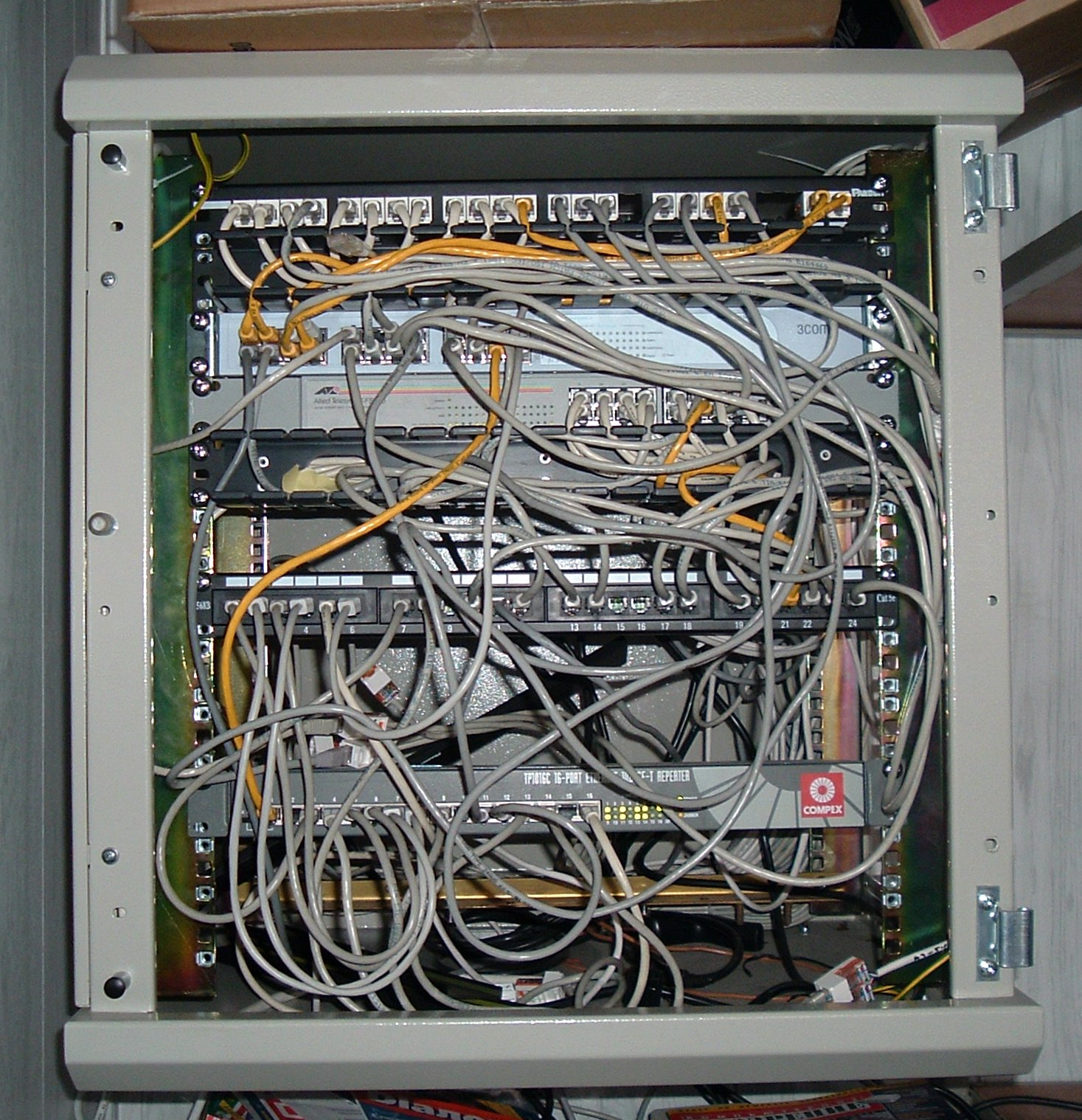
An equipment box of the type that might be found in a wiring cupboard

A wiring closet or wiring cabinet is a small room or enclosure in a building where electrical and telecommunications equipment are situated, allowing access to circuits and network connections. Wiring closets are commonly found in schools, offices, and other institutional or commercial buildings. While they are used for many purposes, their most common use is for computer networking, where it may be called a premises wire distribution room.

Many types of network connections place limits on the distance between end user equipment, such as personal computers, and network access devices, such as routers. These restrictions might require multiple wiring cupboards on each floor of a large building.

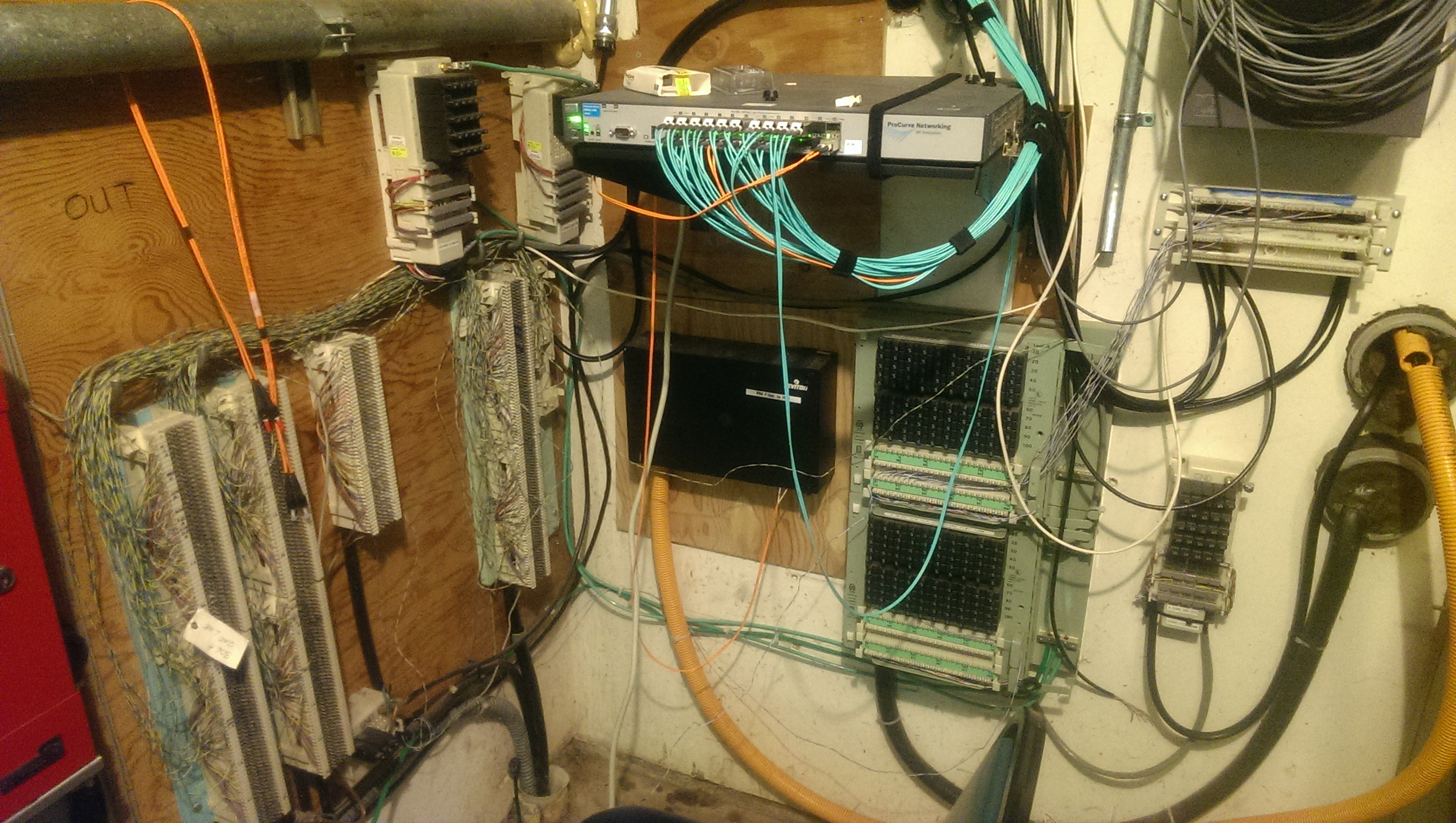
The inside of a wiring closet at a small public university. Visible are a common network switch known as an optical fiber switch (top), a 66-type punch block (left), and two 110-type punch blocks (right, bottom). The orange conduit contains optical fiber cable.

Wiring closets are usually organized, with tagged or labeled cables which are often grouped together and secured with nylon cable ties, cable tie mounts and wire clamps, for ease of wire management, and device location and troubleshooting.

Some sorts of equipment which might be found in a wiring closet include:

- Alarm systems
- Circuit breaker panels
- Fiber cable terminations
- Network switches
- Patch panels
- Punch-down blocks
- Wireless access points
- Video systems, such as cable TV and closed-circuit television (CCTV) systems

== See also ==
- Equipment room
- Server room
- On-premises wiring
