= Punch down tool =

Small hand tool used by telecommunication and network technicians

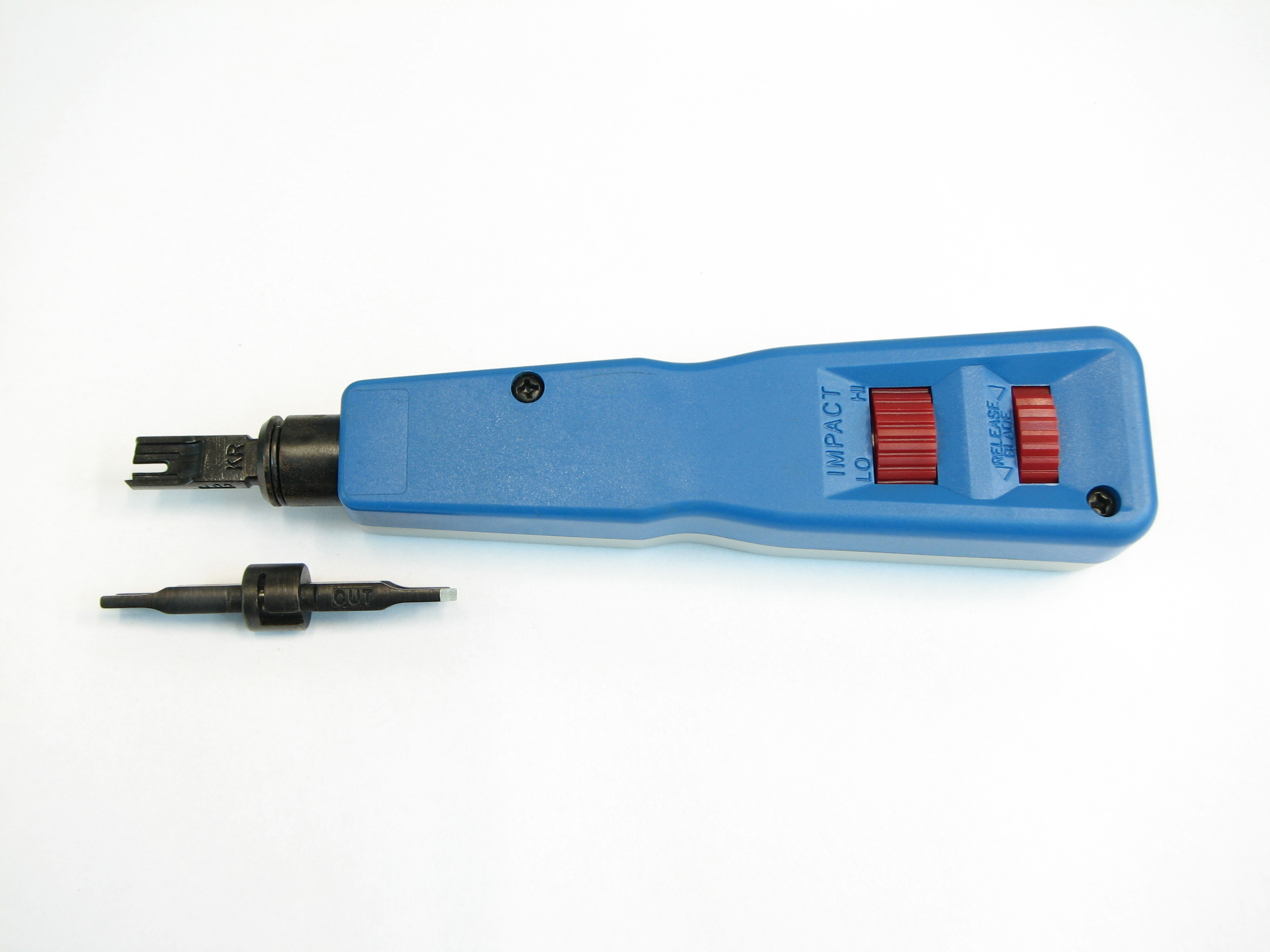
A punch down tool with interchangeable blades

A punch down tool, punchdown tool, IDC tool, or a Krone tool (named after the Krone LSA-PLUS connector), is a small hand tool used by telecommunication and network technicians. It is used for inserting wire into insulation-displacement connectors on punch down blocks, patch panels, keystone modules, and surface mount boxes (also known as biscuit jacks).

== Description and use ==
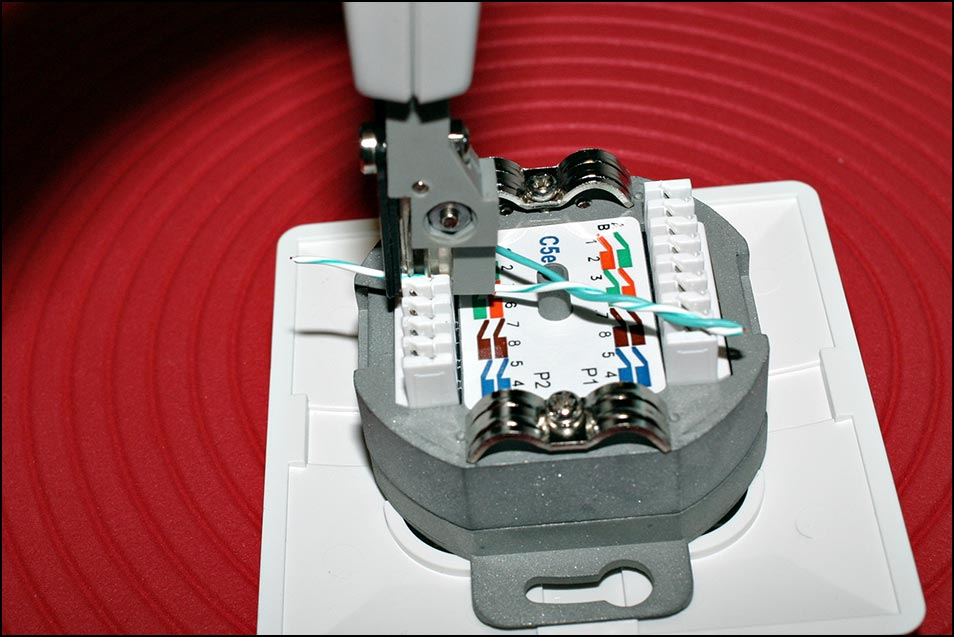
A punch down tool in use, terminating a twisted pair cable into a Cat5e receptacle

Most punch down tools are of the impact type, consisting of a handle, an internal spring mechanism, and a removable slotted blade. To use the punch down tool, a wire is pre-positioned into a slotted post on a punch block, and then the punch down tool is pressed down on top of the wire, over the post. Once the required pressure is reached, an internal spring is triggered, and the blade pushes the wire into the slot, simultaneously cutting the insulation and securing the wire. The tool blade does not cut through the wire insulation to make contact, but rather the sharp edges of the slot in the contact post itself slice through the insulation.

However, the punch down tool blade also is usually used to cut off excess wire, in the same operation as making the connection; this is done with a sharp edge of the punch down tool blade trapping the wire to be cut against the plastic punch block. If this cutoff feature is heavily used, the tool blade must be resharpened or replaced from time to time. Tool blades without the sharp edge are also available; these are used for continuing a wire through a slotted post to make connections with another slotted post ("daisy-chained" wiring).

For light-duty use, there are also less-expensive punch down tools with fixed blades and no impact mechanism. These low-cost tools are more time-consuming for making reliable connections, and can cause muscle fatigue when used for large numbers of connections.

To accommodate different connector types, 66, 110, BIX and krone blocks require different blades. Removable blades for 66 or 110 are almost always double-ended. Some blades have one end that only inserts the wire for daisy-chain wiring from post to post, and another end that inserts wire and trims the excess length for termination at a post. Other blades have a cutting 66 blade on one end and a cutting 110 blade on the other. Krone blades require a separate scissor-like mechanism for trimming the wire.
