= Spudger =

Tool for adjusting or separating components

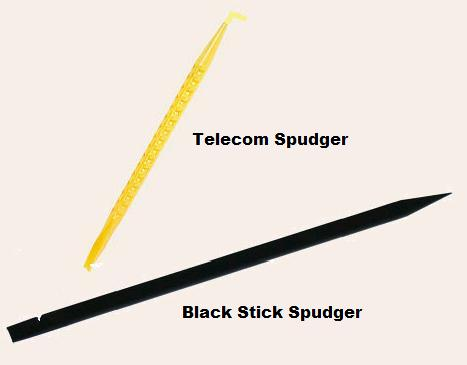
Two varieties of spudgers

A spudger (also known as a spludger or non-marring nylon black stick tool) is a tool used to separate pressure-fit plastic components without causing damage during separation. It has a wide flat-head screwdriver-like end that extends as a wedge, for easy insertion into narrow slots.

== Uses ==
The flat end of the spudger is often used to loosen or release components inside electronics, for example during the replacement of batteries or touch screens for smartphones. The other end is often a point or a hook depending on application. When applied to separate pressure-fit panels, there is often a point to create an initial gap before the wedge end is utilized.

A spudger is also a wiring tool used for poking or adjusting small wires or components, generally in the electronics and telecommunications industries. A typical spudger is an insulating stick, made of either wood, plastic or a nylon fiberglass material. For instances where the spudger is used for prising it is commonly made of stainless steel or other metals.

== Materials and versions ==
The most common modern spudger is a black or yellow nylon stick with a metal hook at one end. Various versions have blunt, sharpened, or insulated hooks. The hook can be used for pulling bridge clips from 66 blocks, manipulating wires in a crowded wire wrap block, or setting DIP switches. The body of a plastic spudger is usually contoured to offer a better grip. Some spudgers are made of orangewood, used in electronics assembly and soldering because of its heat tolerance and dense grain. The same orangewood sticks are commonly used in filmmaking, manicure and pedicure, but these industries do not use the term "spudger".

In telecom applications like punch-down terminal blocks and cell phone repair, the spudger is made of a non-conductive material to prevent transmission of a static shock or direct short to sensitive electrical components' inputs or outputs. This is critical with high density applications where uninsulated terminals are in close proximity, like a battery or with telephone patch junctions.

== See also ==
- 110 block
- Punchdown tool
