= Merlin II =

Merlin II or Merlin 2 may refer to:

- Swearingen Merlin II, an airplane
- Merlin II, an aeroengine in the Rolls-Royce Merlin line
- Merlin II, a telephone system in the AT&T Merlin line
- Merlin 2, a rocket engine concept by SpaceX
