= AT&T Merlin =

Corporate telephone system

AT&T Merlin five-button telephone (voice terminal) manufactured in early 1980

Introduced in 1983, (the year before the breakup of The Bell System), AT&T Merlin was a business KTS (Key Telephone System) manufactured by Western Electric, at the time the manufacturing division of AT&T, American Telephone and Telegraph.

Merlin was designed at the beginning of the 1980s prior to the Bell System breakup as a electronic replacement for the electromechanical 1A2 Key Telephone System. Merlin was the first all electronic KTS system. Most noticeable were the sleek, designed from scratch station sets, replacing the 2500 series key sets whose styling dated to 1949, 34 years - the longest run of any Bell System telephone set. Sold in two line, six station set Model 206; four line 10 station set Model 410), and eight line 20 station set Model 820. Later the 10 line 30 station set Model 1030 expandable to 30 lines and 70 station sets was introduced.

Next in succession was the Merlin Plus, the base model being 4/10 expandable to 8/20 with built in features that previously required separate Feature Modules. Also noteable was a new line of station sets that replaced the membrane line buttons with more conventional push buttons which provided tactile feedback.

== Predecessors ==
The 1A2 Key Telephone System and later ComKey series (4-16, 7-18, 14-34) had the following problems which the Merlin system sought to solve with a microprocessor design:

- Complex mechanical line switches in every telephone
- Each individual line pair plus control and lamp pairs must be run to each individual telephone, making for expensive on-premises wiring
- Telephones were connected to one another using labor intensive point to point wiring
- Control units consisted of many separate components including a power supply, line and feature module carrier, and punch blocks
- Compared to more modern designs emerging in the 1970s, manufacturing and maintaining the system became very expensive, especially by the 1980s
- Basic features were present such as line switching, intercom, and hold but there was little possibility for addition of modern features

== History ==
The Merlin system fixed these problems by:

- Having line switching done completely electronically at the control unit (Horizon was the first to do so)
- Using 4-pair wiring (one pair for control signals, two pairs for two independent analog voice paths, and one pair for -48V power and ground). The Horizon system was the first design attempt of a "skinny cable" key system in the world and was introduced in the late 1970s with similar control unit switching but didn’t gain similar popularity however it did provide the foundation of the system employed on Merlin
- An important advance in handset design was the use of printed circuit boards and automated assembly which were economical to produce. Horizon, Dimension and Merlin were leaders in the use of PCB based handsets.
- Fully electronic, all inclusive, one piece control unit
- Slots for feature modules made possible optional extra price features such as Speed Dialing, Automatic Line Selection, and Redial
- The Merlin telephones were also backwards compatible to the higher end enterprise systems, such as then System 75 and System 85 systems, then later Definity system, now called Communication Manager platforms.

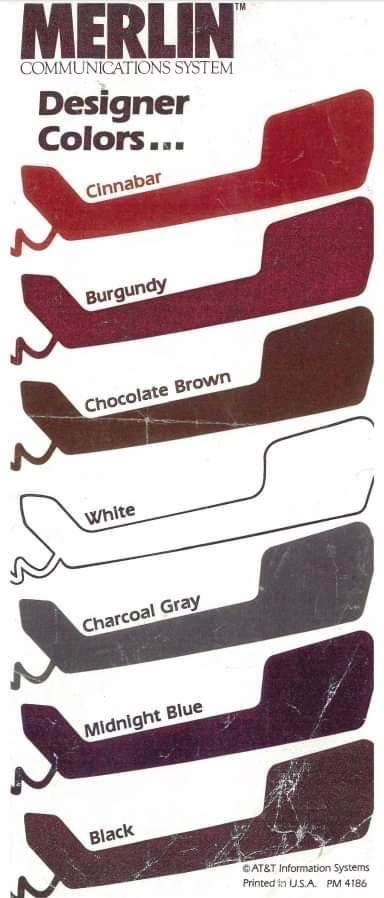

Merlin phones were offered in a variety of high-gloss plastic color choices of black, midnight blue, charcoal gray, white, chocolate brown, burgundy, and cinnabar (red). For an example of model numbers including color codes, the 7303H01D 10-Button Membrane Voice Terminal were available as: 7303H01D-03 (BLACK) 105217509, 7303H01D-58 (WHITE) 105217517, 7303HO1D-104 (BROWN) 105217525, 7303H01D-139 (GRAY) 105217533, 7303H01D-142 (MID BLUE) 105214541, 7303H01D-143 (BURGUNDY) 105217558, 7303H01D-144 (CINNABAR) 105217566, and 7303H01D-215 (MISTY) 105217608.

According to Steve Mak, an engineer who worked in the Merlin division (codenamed Antelope) at Bell Labs/Western Electric, "Black was 80% of total phones sold and much harder to maintain quality because of the high gloss defects actually showed up more pronounced than the other colors. At its peak, we were producing as much as 5,000 phones a day at our Shreveport manufacturing facility." When the membrane phone series was replaced with the new SP- and BIS- phone series, these color choices were all eliminated except black.

The original Merlin was replaced with the Merlin Plus system in the late 1980s, using circuit cards to be expandable to 8 lines and 20 telephones, much like the original 820 model. The original Merlin Plus was dubbed the 820d. It is identical in features to the earlier Merlin, the 820, with the Feature Package 2 cartridge installed. Following the 820d was the 820d2. The 820d2 included the previous features as the 820d but featured an Automatic System Access (ASA) processor coupled with a voice synthesis capabilities and a Busy Buster. The ASA processor provided users with call forwarding, direct extension dial, and system answer capabilities. The busy buster allowed users to have the 820d2 automatically retry a busy number every minute for up to 10 minutes and notify the user when the call was connected. Both the ASA and Busy Buster required a their own voice terminal port to function. In the early 1990s, the Merlin II and Merlin Legend debuted with even more features and expandability, and new MLX telephones, but the system was also backwards compatible with the original Merlin telephones.

A Merlin Legend system in an office building. There is at least electrical pin-compatibility between the Magix and the Legend, as a Magix DS1 board (colored grey) can be seen installed in this system.

In 1999, Lucent Technologies introduced the Merlin Magix as the replacement for the Merlin Legend. The Magix's carrier was metal and, as such, modules were not encased inside plastic shells as they were with the Legend. The Merlin Magix supports new 4400 series digital telephones as well as older MLX telephones, but it does not support the old ATL series telephones. One important item with the conversion of Legend to Magix, is how MLX telephones use 2-pair wiring and the newer Magix/4400 series phones only use a single (1) pair. This made the Magix easier to install and more competitive in the marketplace, as most other digital PBX systems only use a single (1) pair to each station/telephone.

On October 2, 2006, Avaya discontinued sales of the Magix system.

Merlin sets shared over 50 pieces of plastic with digital telephones of the Dimension PBX as well as membrane switch technology (a first use in AT&T), reducing product introduction costs in 1983.

== "Skinny cable" revolution ==
The 1A2 phone system was the only multi-line telephone system solution for many decades, but it also had feature limitations, complex cable management, and high maintenance cost for adds, moves, or changes. Each 1A2 multi-line telephone required at least a 25-pair Category 3 cable necessary for line access and button/light controls, with some receptionist telephones requiring a 50-pair or 100-pair connection for one attendant console.

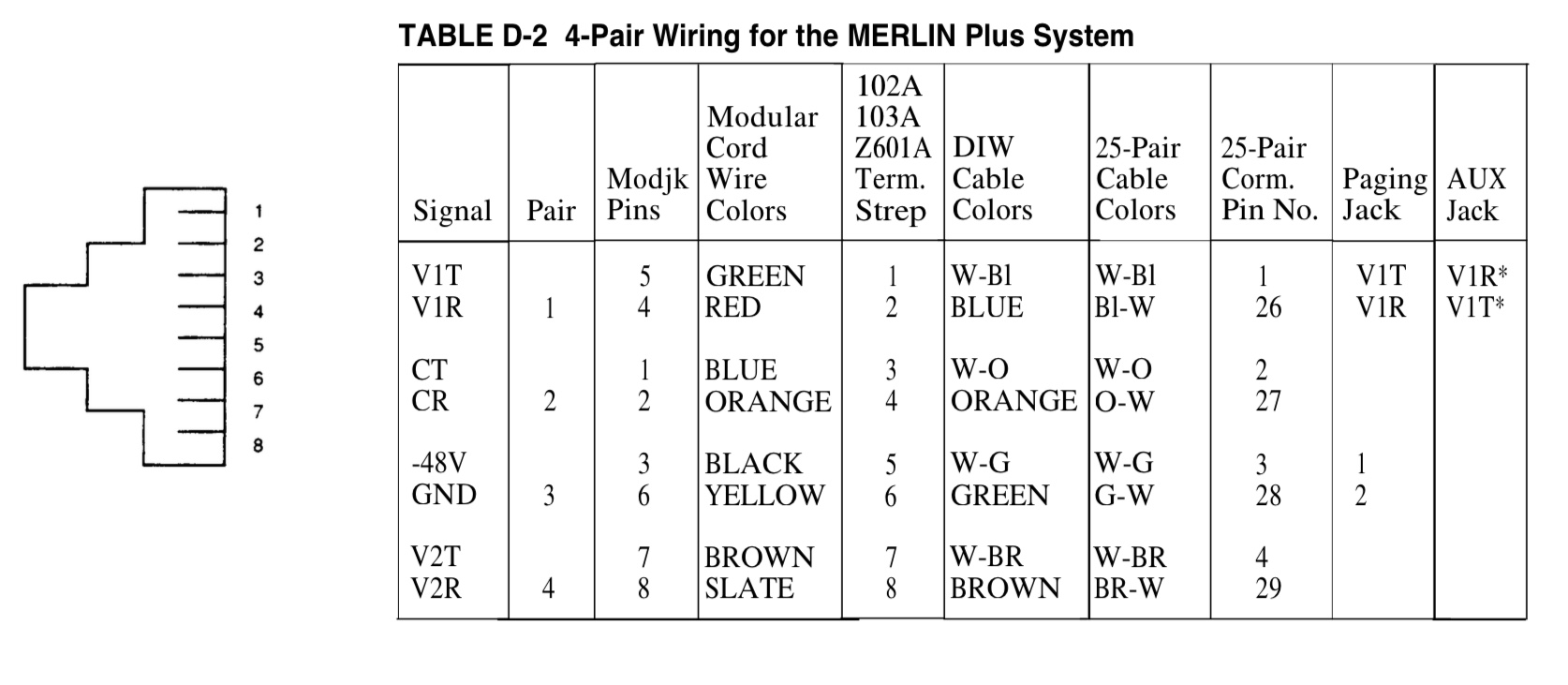

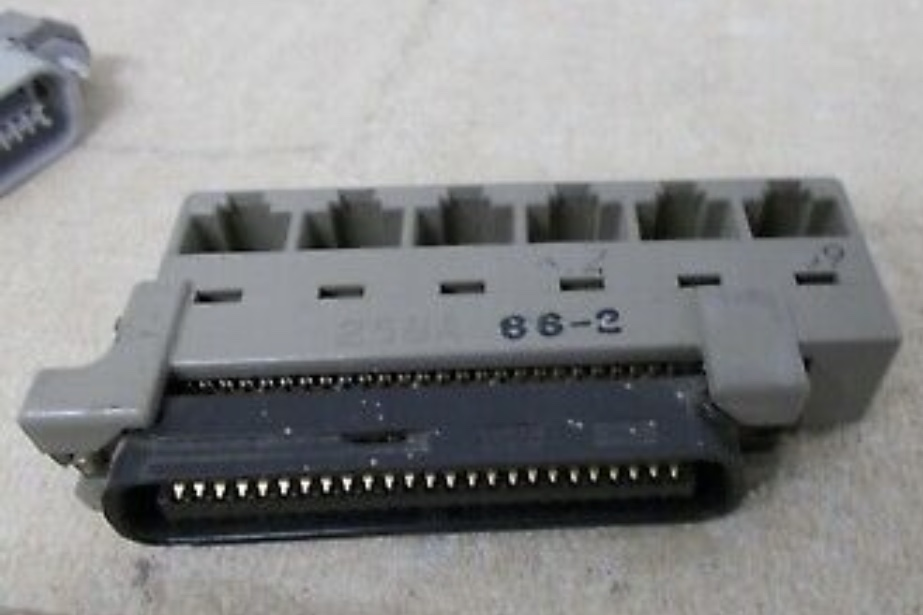

The Merlin system (and its predecessor the AT&T Horizon system) was designed to eliminate the outward complexities of 1A2, including the difficult and expensive 25-pair cable. Engineers were able to utilize electronic switching in the control unit (KSU) instead of switching in the phone itself so all the Merlin system telephones were more like mainframe dumb terminals (AT&T actually called them voice terminals instead of “phones”), reducing telephone cost and simplifying troubleshooting.

The Merlin system introduced a new wiring design of eight wires (four-pair) that allowed the system to deliver two voice paths to each desk phone so a user on an active telephone call could still receive a paging announcement on their phone’s desk speaker simultaneously. AT&T described the signaling channel on the data pair as “analog multi-line telephone protocol (40 kbps)” but no further details were made available about the protocol.

Attached here is the pin-out diagram of the new "skinny cable", only requiring 4 twsted pairs to each station set while providing the same multiline functionality of 1A2 and more. It uses the 8P8W (erroneously often called an RJ45) connector to connect each phone (voice terminal) to its associated extension jack on the Merlin control unit (KSU).

For sites with previously installed 1A2 systems, an adapter was available that could simply be connected to the 25 pair Amphenol ribbon connector standard on all manufacturers of1A2 Key Systems.

== Merlin 206, 410, 820 cartridge information ==
=== Cartridge Type I ===
Feature Package 1 (Available for use in Classic Merlin 206, 410 only):

- 5-party conference calling
- Ringer options
- Prevents outgoing calls on individual phones
- Privacy
- Automatic outside and intercom dialing
- Last number redial, automatic line selection, do-not-disturb
- On-hook dialing, call transfer, hold reminder, group listening

Feature Package II (Included same features as Feature Package I plus the following)

- Personal and system wide 3 digit speed dialing
- Personalized Ringing
- Call pickup
- Group paging zones

=== Cartridge Type II ===
Music On Hold

- Allows a music source to be connected to the KSU which is heard by a caller on hold

Music On Hold/Paging

- Allows a music source to be connected to the KSU which is heard by a caller on hold
- Provides a paging system connection and music on hold to be used as background music while no pages are being made.

=== Cartridge Type III ===
Power Failure/Extra Alert

- Provides two RJ-11 jacks for standard touch-tone or rotary phone use in case of power failure.
- Extra Alert jack for external notification device.

== Merlin device add-on accessories ==
=== Data Collector ===
Used only with the Merlin Plus system for logging calls or configuration to a printer. The Merlin Plus system Data Collector uses information from the Call Report and System Feature Report features and transmits the material from the Merlin Plus system to a printer or to a PC with a standard RS232-C, 1200 baud, serial interface, connected to an available voice terminal port on the KSU.

The data collector can hold up to one full page of printout, 60 lines of 80 characters each. The collector disregards any material over the one page limit.

=== Door phone controller (DAC-1Z) ===
A door phone controller (DAC-1Z) can be connected to your Merlin Plus system to allow employees to answer calls made from a business entrance.

It is connected directly to a CO line port on the Merlin Plus control unit. Callers using the door phone can press a button at the building entrance to ring a telephone in your Merlin Plus system. An auxiliary alert device (such as a doorbell, chime, or tone generator) can be connected to the door phone controller so that it will ring when the door phone button is pushed.

An optional electric strike plate release can be obtained for door operation to permit the caller to unlock the door by entering a preset code on the door phone keypad. The electric strike plate can also provide an alarm that sounds when the door is opened by unauthorized means or is not closed within a certain amount of time.

Although the door phone controller can be configured to connect to either a Central Office (CO) port or a station port, it is recommended that only the CO port connection be used. The CO port to which the door phone controller is connected can be dedicated to the door phone controller, or shared by a CO line and the door phone controller.

=== General Purpose Adapter (GPA) ===
Because the Merlin system was designed to support only Merlin phones, the General Purpose Adapter allows for the connection of non-Merlin equipment such as cordless phones and answering machines. The General Purpose Adapter is a small box about the size of two packs of playing cards and connects through the Other Port on the underside of most Merlin voice terminals, providing power and voice connectivity in one proprietary Other cable. The connected analog device shares the extension and call of the Merlin phone it is connected with.

=== Basic Telephone and Modem Interface (BTMI-2) ===
Connecting a standard analog telephone to the proprietary Merlin system requires an external adapter unit called a Basic Telephone and Modem Interface. This device is connected to an available port normally used for a proprietary Merlin phone extension is used. There is no limit to the number of BTMI units can be connected to a Merlin system, as long as an extension port is available for each unit. Any standard analog telephone device, such as a cordless phone or analog computer modem, can be connected to the BTMI's phone port. Through Merlin system programming, the order of lines selected for outgoing calls can be set for when the analog user dials 9 to make an external call. Other Merlin telephones can be called by simply dialing the Merlin extension number from the analog phone. Call waiting is available for the analog user, although can be disabled for computer modem use by moving the BTMI-2 mode selector switch to the Data setting. System features such as call hold, transferring, last number redial and saved number redial are available through the use of special DTMF codes. Message Waiting lamp illumination is compatible for analog phones that are equipped with that feature.
