= 110 block =

Type of punch-down block

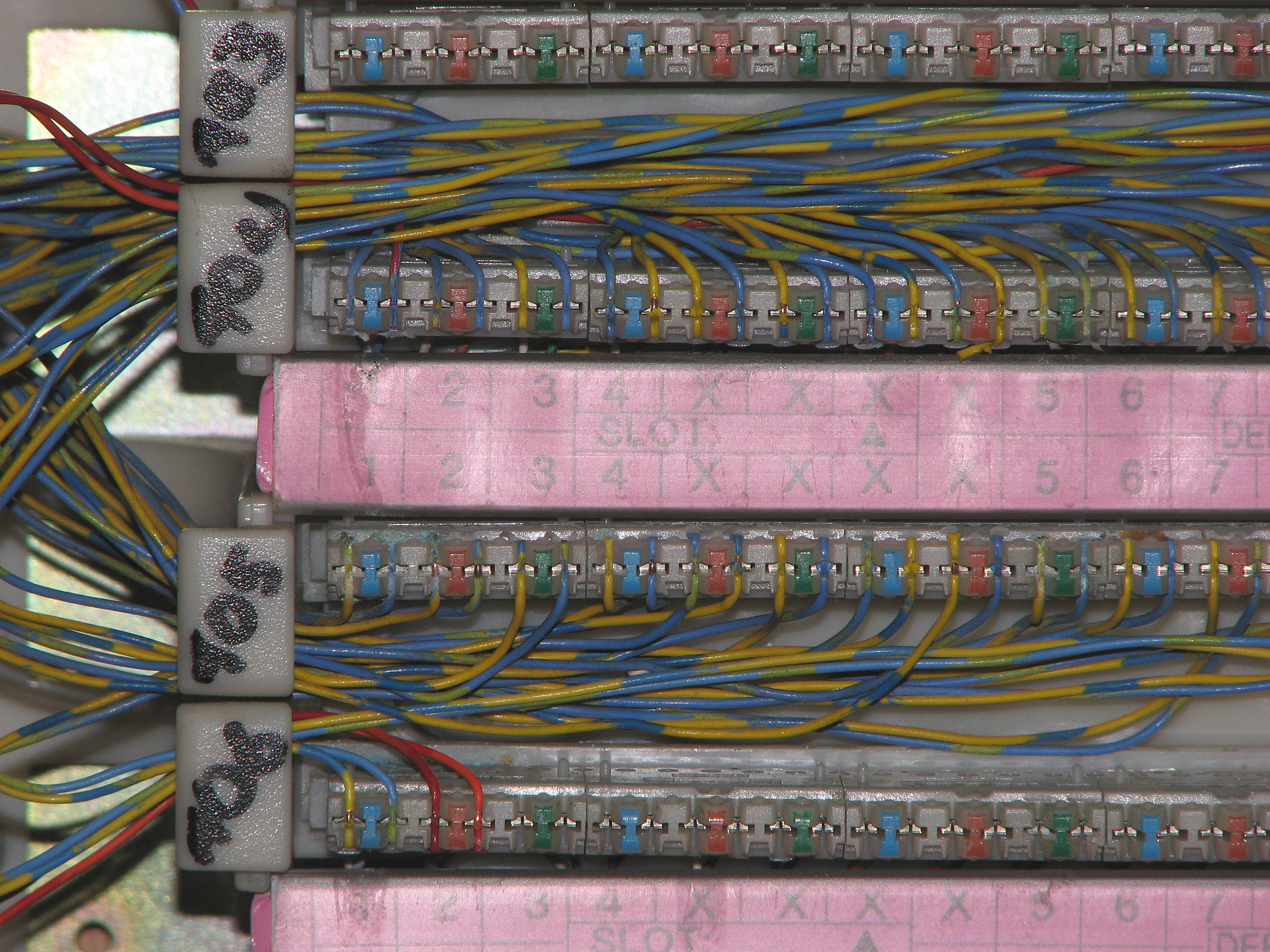
A 110 punch block

A 110 block is a type of punch-down block used to terminate runs of on-premises wiring in a structured cabling system. The designation 110 is also used to describe a type of insulation displacement contact (IDC) connector used to terminate twisted pair cables, which uses a punch-down tool similar to the type used for the older 66 block.

== Usage ==
=== Telephone distribution ===
Early residential telephone systems used simple screw terminals to join cables to sockets in a tree topology. These screw-terminal blocks have been slowly replaced by 110 blocks and connectors. Modern homes usually have phone service entering the house to a single 110 block, whence it is distributed by on-premises wiring to outlet boxes throughout the home in star topology. At the outlet box, cables are attached to ports with insulation-displacement contacts (IDCs), and those ports fit into special faceplates.

In commercial settings, this style of home run or star topology wiring was already in use on 66 blocks in telecom closets and switchrooms. The 110 block has been slowly replacing the 66 block, especially for data communications usage.

=== Computer networks ===
The 110 style insulation-displacement connection is often used at both ends of networking cables such as Category 5, Category 5e, Category 6, and Category 6A cables which run through buildings, as shown in the image. In switch rooms, 110 blocks are often built into the backs of patch panels to terminate cable runs. At the other end, 110 connections may be used with keystone modules that are attached to wall plates. 110 blocks are preferred over 66 blocks in high-speed networks because they introduce less crosstalk and many are certified for use in Category 5, Category 6 and Category 6A wiring systems.

Individual Category 5e and better-rated 8P8C jacks (keystone and patch panel) with IDC connectors commonly use the same punchdown 'teeth' dimensions and tools as a full size 110 block.

== Advantages ==
110 style blocks allow a much higher density of terminations in a given space than older style termination blocks (66 style or wire wrap) because of their stacking capability. Some 110 blocks meet specifications for higher bandwidth data protocols such as Category 5 and higher.

== Problems ==
During regular usage, very small pieces of insulation can become stuck inside the 110 block contacts; this renders that given pair unreliable or unusable, until the pieces are removed. A tool known as a spudger can be used to remove excess insulation pieces. The wire hook which comes with many punch down tools can also be used to remove wire pieces.

A new wire inserted over an existing insulation remnant may be unreliable, as the 110 IDC was designed to hold only a single wire per contact.

For testing it is more difficult to reliably connect to a working circuit on a 110 block than on older style blocks. The circuit must be broken, or insulation displacing contacts may be used on jumper wires. Repeated use of insulation displacing contacts may lead to a difficult-to-locate broken or intermittently-failing jumper wire.

== See also ==
- 66 block
- Telecommunications Industry Association
- Electronic Industries Alliance
- Electrical wiring
- Krone LSA-PLUS
