= Krone LSA-PLUS =

Telecommunications connector

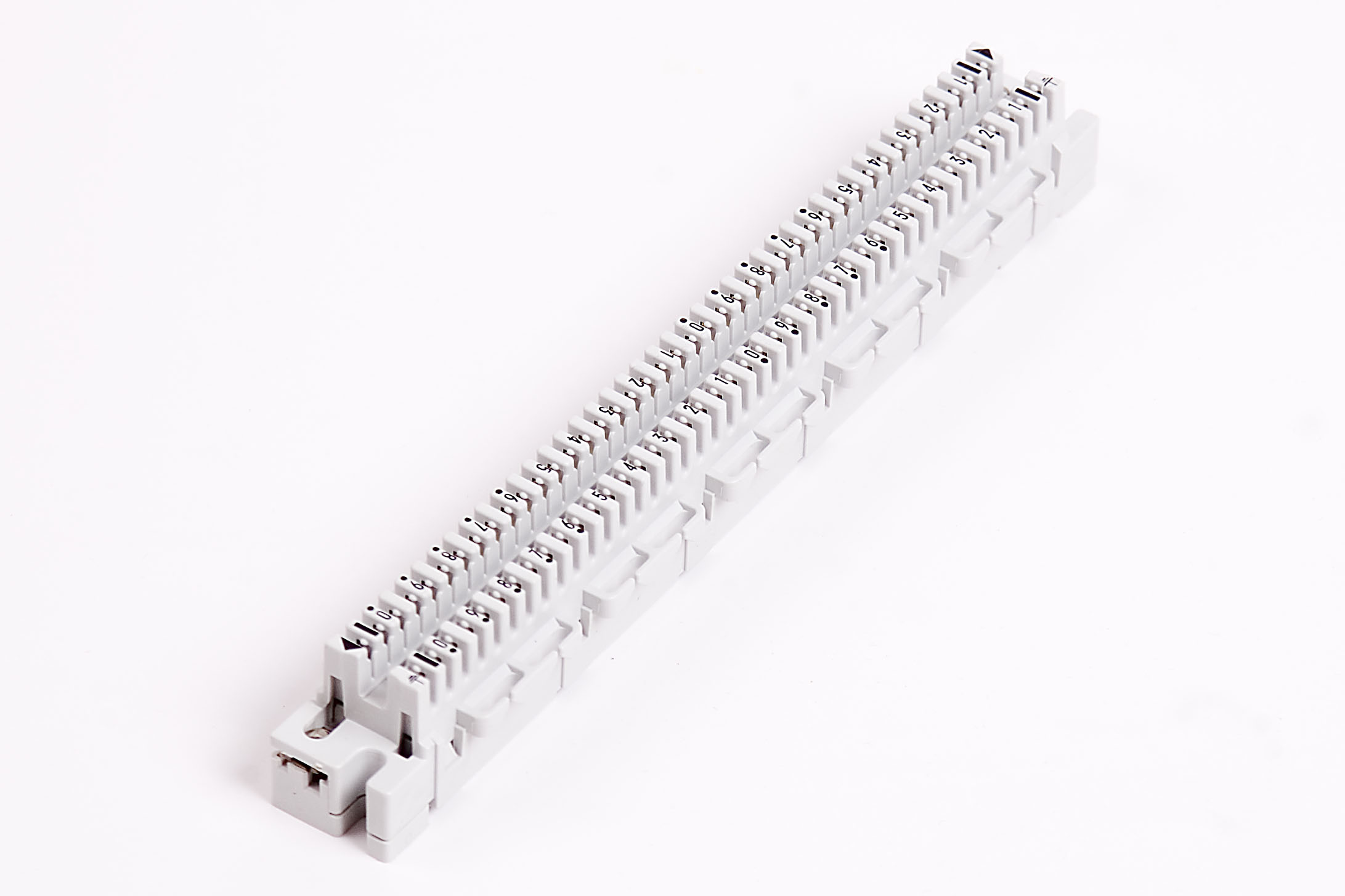
A punch block using krone contacts

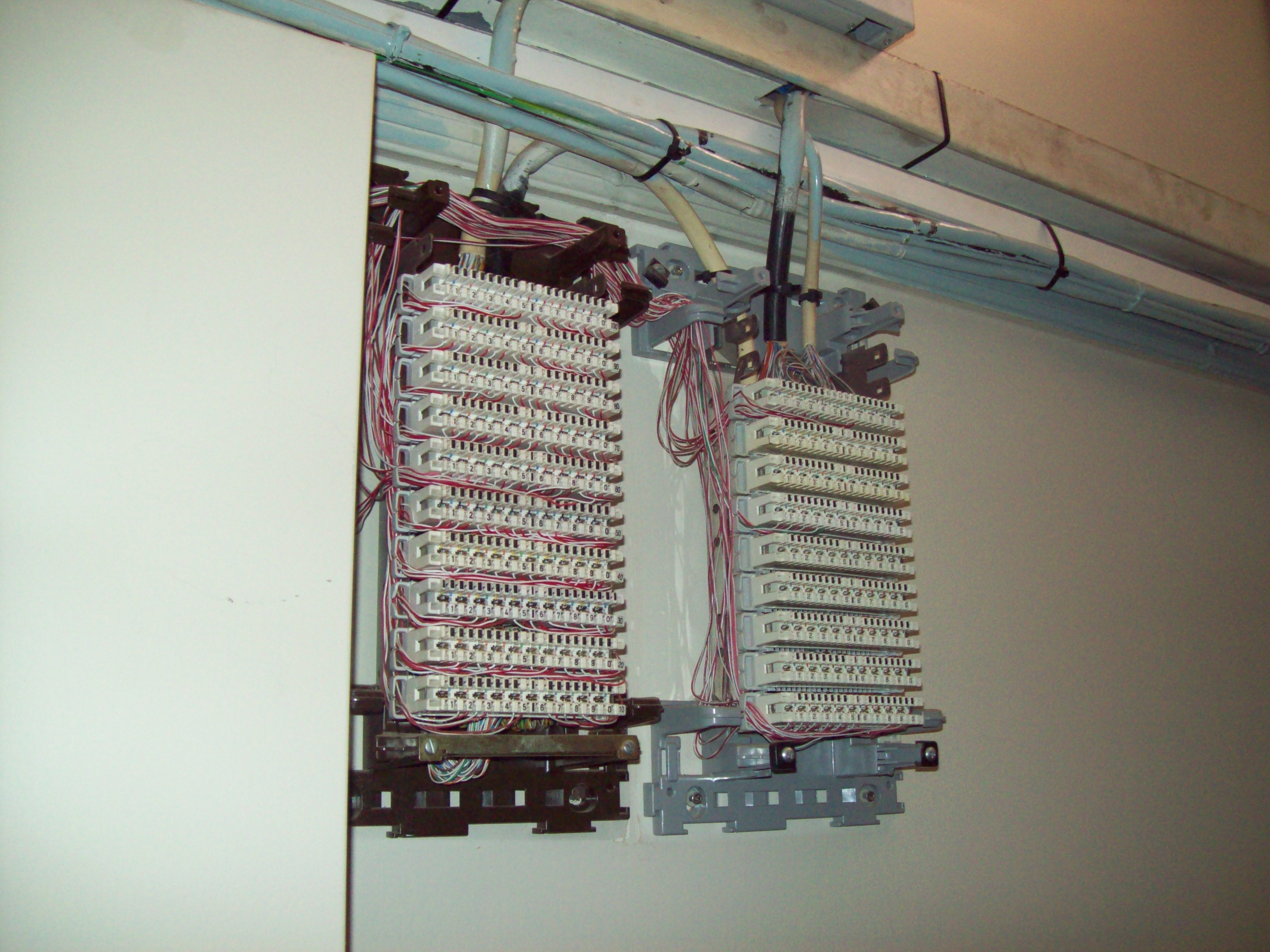
Cross connect field with krone connectors

Krone LSA-PLUS (or simply krone) is an insulation-displacement connector for telecommunications. It is a proprietary European alternative to 110 block. The Krone LSA-PLUS system is not limited to telecommunications, as it is also popular in broadcast systems, where audio interconnections and their associated control systems often use krone wiring. Multipair audio cables have been specifically designed for the system by organisations such as the BBC.

== History ==
Krone (German word for crown) was developed in Berlin in the 1970s by The Krone Group, a German telecommunications company. In 2004, Krone was acquired by the American corporation ADC Telecommunications—which was in turn later acquired by Tyco Electronics in 2010. As of 2015 ADC/Krone Telecom Solutions is a division of CommScope Inc.

== Characteristics ==
LSA-PLUS is a German abbreviation:

Lötfrei	Solderless
Schraubfrei	Screwless
Abisolierfrei	No insulation removal
Preiswert	Cost-effective
Leicht zu handhaben	Easy to use
Universell anwendbar	Universal application
Sicher und schnell	Secure and fast

Krone can be easily distinguished from 110 by its contact slots being arranged at a 45-degree angle to the wire. Krone contacts can be used with stranded conductors, unlike 66- and 110-style IDC punch blocks. The contacts use silver to inhibit corrosion and require a Krone-specific punch down tool for wire insertion. Krone blocks are also available in versions which can handle frequencies much higher than conventional blocks.
