= Service termination point =

In telecommunications, the service termination point is the last point of service rendered by a commercial carrier under applicable tariffs.

Usually, the service termination point is on the customer premises and corresponds to the demarcation point. The customer is responsible for equipment and operation from the service termination point to user end instruments.
