= BIX (telephony) =

Telephony system

BIX (Building Industry Cross-connect) is part of a telephony cross-connect system (integrated building distribution network – IBDN) created in the 1970s by Nortel Networks. As a system, it consists of various sizes of punch-down blocks, cable distribution accessories (such as moulded rings and strips), and a punch-down tool to terminate wires at the punch-down block. The BIX cross-connect system as a whole is certified for Category-5e. The BIX cross-connect system is primarily composed of two parts: the mounts, and the connectors.

== Mounts ==
BIX mounts are wall-mounted frames, generally built from 16 gauge steel. The frames feature a rectangular plastic backplate, and two plastic brackets that extend from either side of the backplate to fit between two and ten BIX connectors. The connectors are oriented horizontally on the mount. The BIX mounts are referred to as either '12E','10A' or '10C'. The 12E frames will mount up to 12 connectors; The 10A frames will mount up to 10 connectors; the 10C frames will mount 2 connectors.

== Connectors ==
BIX connectors are rectangular punch-down blocks used to terminate up to 25 pairs. The connectors have a slip-in fitting which automatically strips the wire as it is punched down, eliminating the need for pre-stripping. BIX connectors also have a pair-splitter to facilitate fast arranging of wires on the punch-down block.

There are many types of BIX connectors, the most popular kinds being the 1A and the 1A4.

1A: Distribution connector, 5-pair markings

1A4: Distribution connector, 4-pair markings

2A: Bridging connector, 12 2-pair clips

5A: Multiplying connector, 5-pair markings

7A: Key apparatus connector

9A: Diode connector, 24 diodes

36B, 36C, 36D: Modular RJ-11 jack connector

== GigaBIX ==
NORDX/CDT developed the GigaBIX IDC–based system with a transmission performance that goes beyond the Category-6 standard and is available in two topologies: the Patch Cord topology and the Cross-Connect Wire topology. It is based on the mature BIX technology, which is over 25 years old and well-established in the telecommunications industry. The termination and installation procedures have been improved, allowing the quality of the system to surpass Category-6. The system guarantees channel bandwidths up to 300 MHz, and can transmit data up to 4.8 Gbit/s.

The GigaBIX system is primarily made up of mounts and connectors. The Patch Cord topology utilizes GigaBIX PS6+ patch cords which are 4 pair 23-AWG UTP cords with a channel bandwidth of 250 MHz or 300 MHz, depending on how they are employed. The Cross-Connect topology utilizes GigaBIX cross-connect wire. Both topologies utilize the same mounts, connectors, distribution frames, and other accessories (such as designation strips, wire guards, covers, distribution rings, and many other accessories).

== History ==
Since the 1970s, Northern Telecom (Nortel), who designed the BIX system, had been manufacturing BIX mounts, connectors and tools in house. Northern Telecom's manufacturing division was called Nortel Cable Group. In February 1996, Nortel Cable Group was sold to Cable Design Technologies Corporation and was renamed to NORDX/CDT. NORDX/CDT subsequently merged with Belden Inc in July 2004, becoming Belden CDT Inc. In May 2007, Belden CDT officially changed its name to Belden. Belden now sells all BIX products including mounts, connectors, tools and accessories previously sold by NORDX/CDT, and before that, Nortel Cable Group.

== See also ==
- Insulation-displacement connector
- Punch-down block
