= 66 block =

Table used to physically connect phone lines

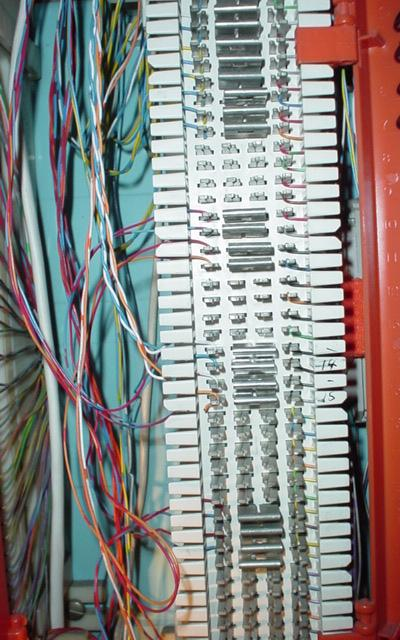
A split 50 M-type 66 block with bridging clips attached

A 66 block is a type of punch-down block used to connect sets of wires in a telephone system. Due to the proliferation of Voice over IP (VoIP), 66 blocks are slowly becoming obsolete.

66 blocks are designed to terminate 20 through 24 AWG insulated solid copper wire. The 66 series connecting block, introduced in the Bell System in 1962, was the first terminating device with insulation displacement connector technology. The term 66 block reflects its Western Electric model number.

66 E blocks are available pre-assembled with an RJ-21 female connector that accepts a quick connection to a 25-pair cable with a male end. These connections are typically made between the block and the customer-premises equipment (CPE).

== Types ==
66 blocks are manufactured in four common configurations: A, B, E and M. (Note: There were many other types manufactured for specific uses such as C, H, J, K, MB, P, R, S, T, Y, AA, and AB.) The A blocks have 25 slotted holes on the left side for positioning the incoming building cable with a 50 slot fanning strip on the right side for distribution cables. The B and M styles have 50 slot fanning strip on both sides. The B style is used mainly in distribution panels where several destinations (often 1A2 key telephones) need to connect to the same source. The M blocks are often used to connect a single instrument to such a distribution block. The E style has five columns of ten 2-clip rows and are used for transitioning from the 25-pair distribution cable to a 25-pair RJ21 style female ribbon connector.

The 25-pair standard non-split 66 block contains 50 rows; each row has two (E) or four (M) or six (A) and (B) columns of clips that are electrically bonded. The 25-pair split 50 66 block is the industry standard for easy termination of voice cabling, and is a standard network termination by telephone companies—generally on commercial properties. Each row contains four (M) or six (B) clips, but the left-side clips are electrically isolated from the right-side clips. Smaller versions also exist with fewer rows for smaller-scale use, such as residential.

== Use ==
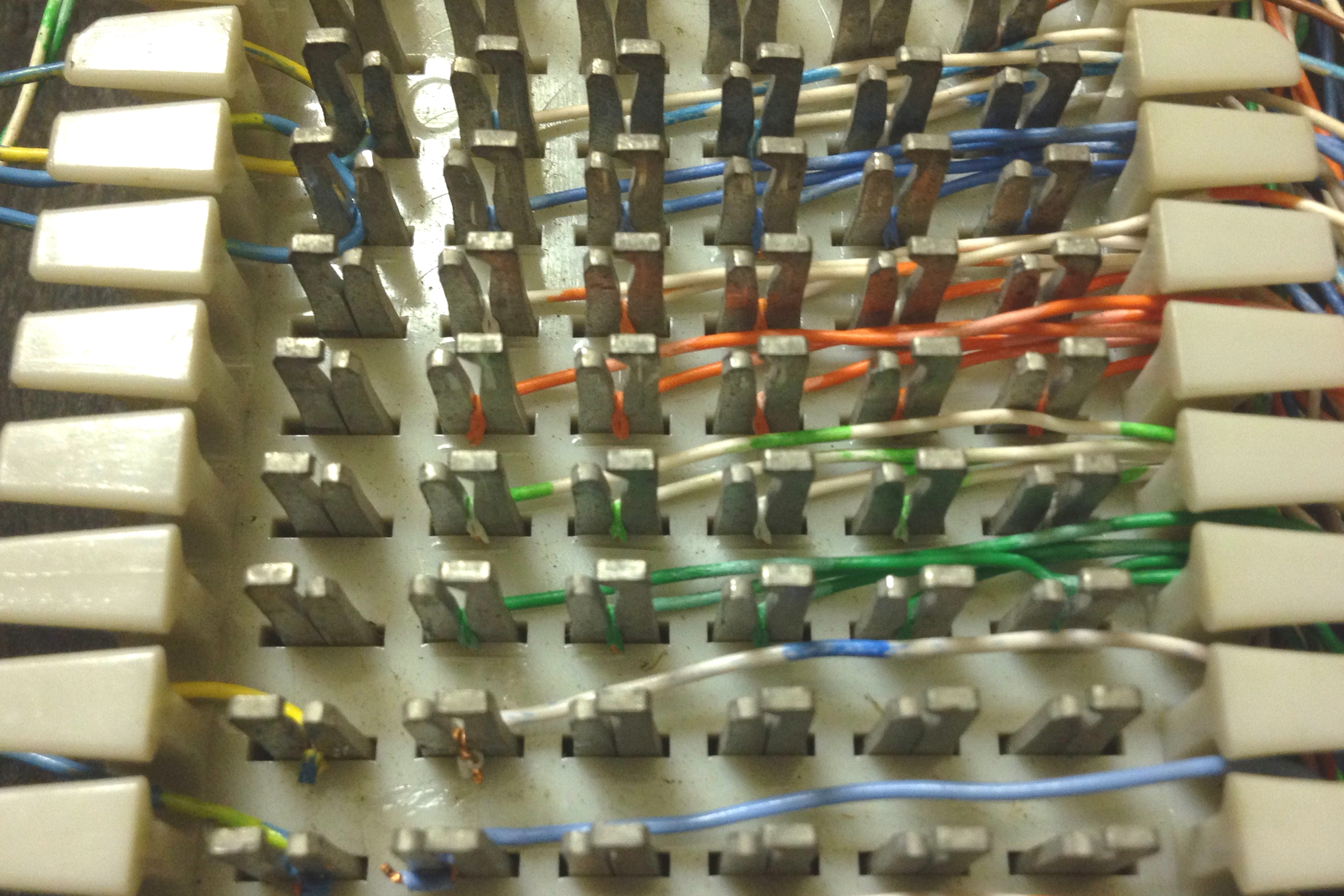
66 block B series with 6 clips in each row. Jumper wires on the left connect the top pair with the bottom pair, allowing to split up to 10 devices.

Circuit pairs are connected to the block with a punch-down tool by terminating the tip wire on the leftmost slot of one row and ring wire on the leftmost slot of the row beneath. Typically, a 25-pair cable coming from the phone company is punched down on the left side of a split-type block in pairs. The right hand side of the block is wired to the customer premises equipment with jumper wires. Bridging clips are used to connect the two center terminals, connecting the left-hand side of a split block with its right-hand side, thus completing the circuit. The clips form the point of interface between the subscriber and the provider. The bridging clips can be easily removed by either the subscriber or phone company personnel for trouble isolation, allowing the ability to split a circuit and determine in which direction trouble may exist. An orange insulating cover attached to a 66 block denotes its designation as a demarcation point by the local exchange carrier.

Modern 110 blocks have largely supplanted 66 blocks for new commercial installations at the end of the 20th century, as the capability for a circuit to carry digital data overlaid its ability to carry analog voice conversations. 110 block termination is almost always compliant with Category 5 (or higher) and therefore capable of supporting 100 MHz (or faster) signaling. Compared to 110 and higher-density wire terminating blocks, 66 blocks are physically large; and because of their maximum 16 MHz Category 3 signaling compatibility, they are ill-suited for high speed (faster than 10BASE-T) data circuits.

Split 50 66 blocks are still used as network interface blocks in distribution frames to interconnect circuits with bridging clips, but are primarily limited to narrowband circuits such as POTS/DSL, DS0, or DS1 circuits.

== See also ==
- 25-pair color code – Form of color code used in wiring
- RJ21 – Often used as a connector for pre-terminated 66 blocks
