= Punch-down block =

Electrical connection often used in telephony

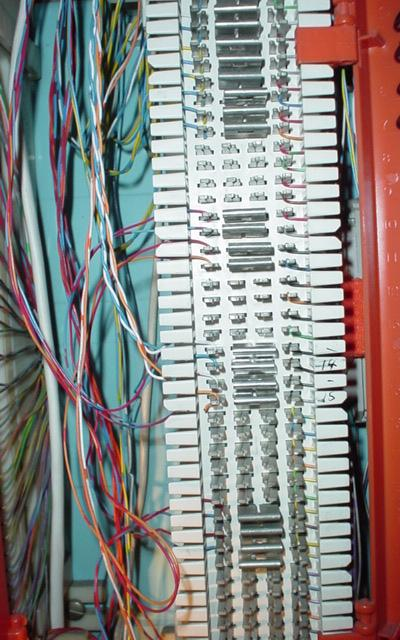
A split-50 M-type 66 block with bridging clips attached

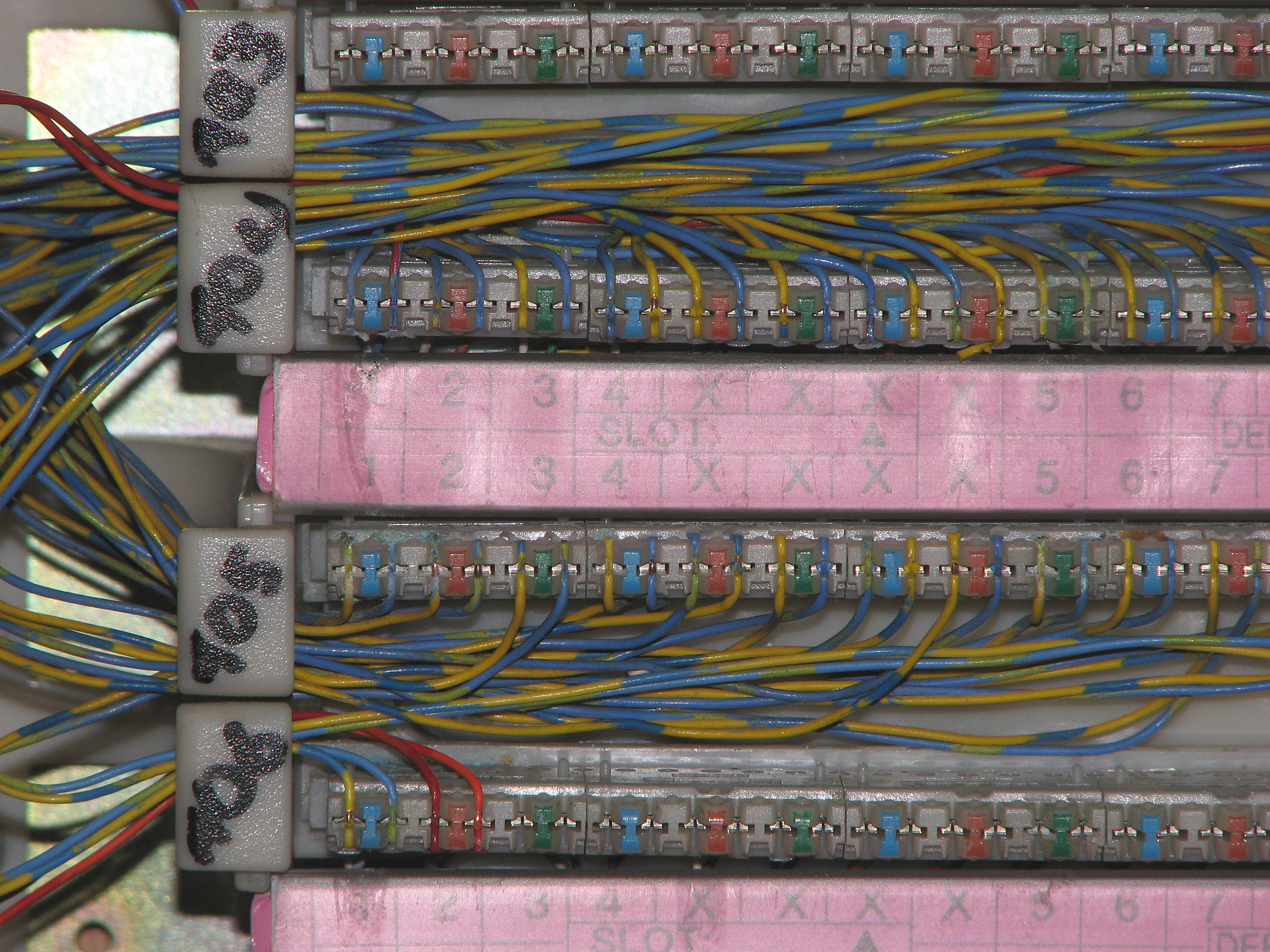
A 110 punch-down block

A punch-down block (also punchdown block, punch block, punchblock, quick-connect block and other variations) is a type of electrical connection often used in telephony. It is named because the solid copper wires are "punched down" into short open-ended slots which are a type of insulation-displacement connector. These slots, usually cut crosswise (not lengthwise) across an insulating plastic bar, contain two sharp metal blades which cut through the wire's insulation as it is punched down. These blades hold the wire in position and make the electrical contact with the wire as well.

== Overview ==
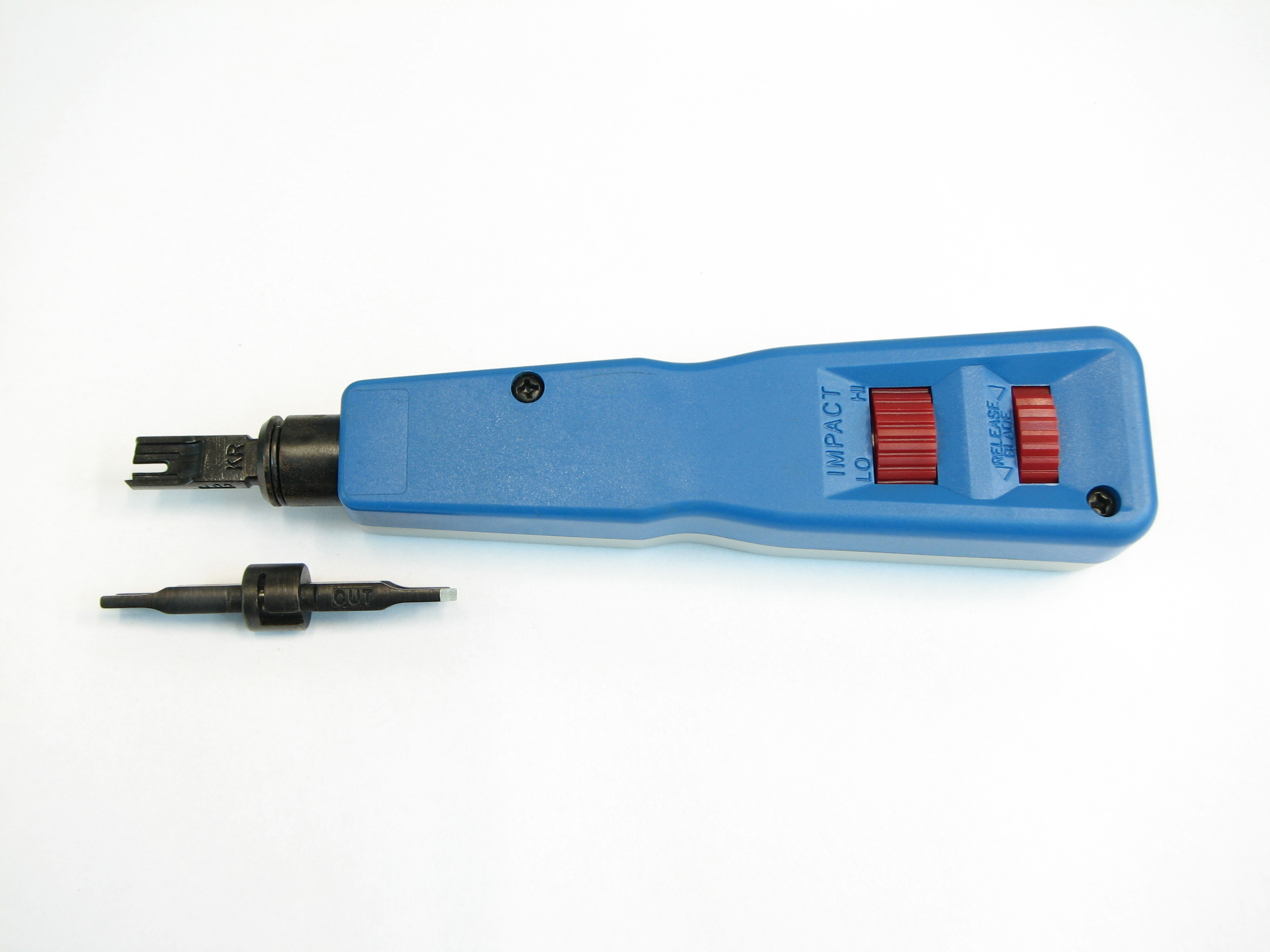
A punch-down tool with interchangeable blades

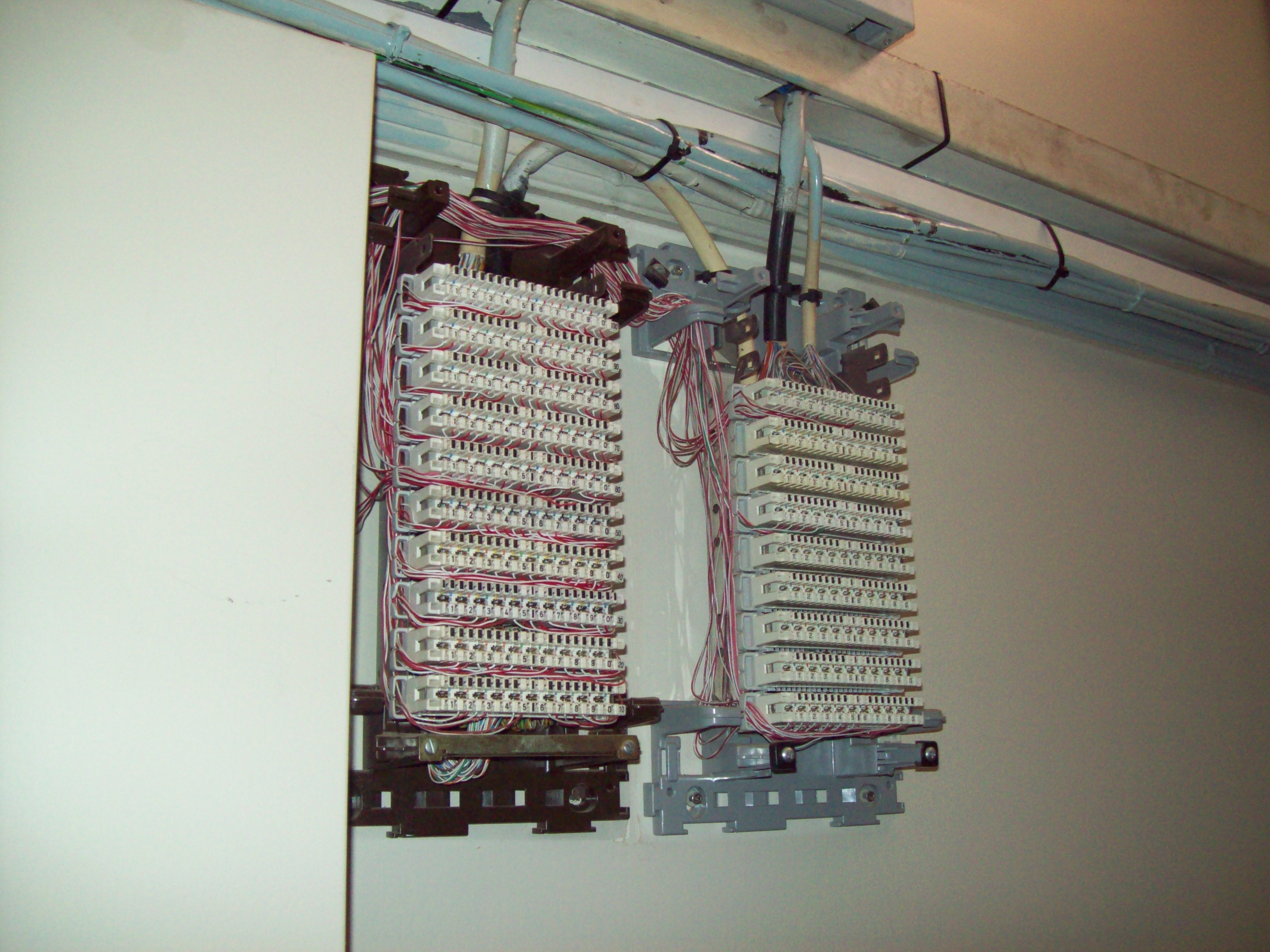
Krone blocks

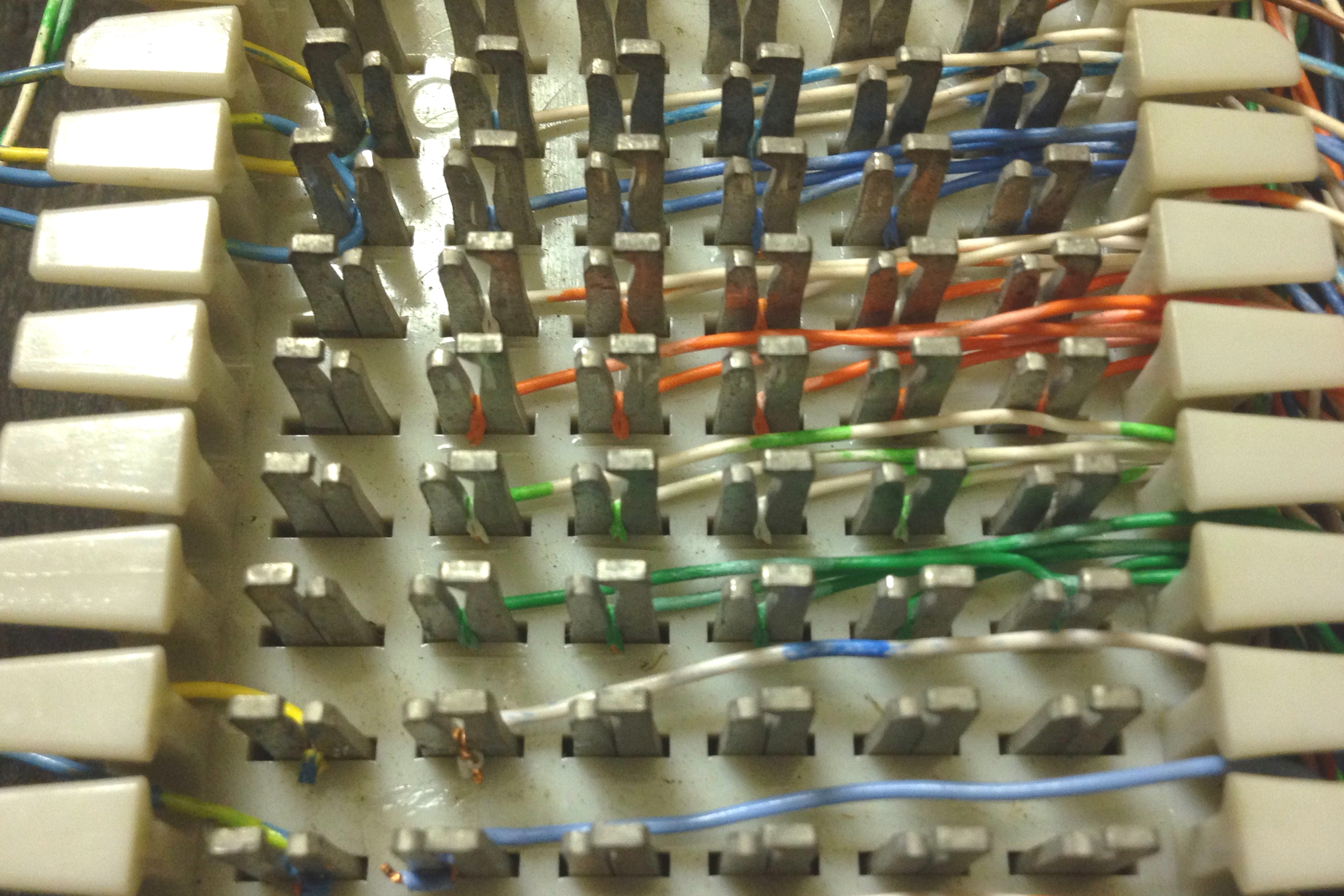
Details of how wires are pushed into the clips of 66 block

A tool called a punch down tool is used to push the wire down firmly and properly into the slot. Some will automatically cut any excess wire off. The exact size and shape of the tool blade varies by manufacturer, which can cause problems for those working on existing installations, especially when there is a poorly documented mix of different brands.

Punch-down blocks are a very quick and easy way to connect wiring, as there is no stripping of insulation and no screws to loosen and tighten. Punch-down blocks are often used as patch panels, or as breakout boxes for PBX or other similar multi-line telephone systems with 50-pin RJ21 (Amphenol) connectors. They are sometimes used in other audio applications, such as in reconfigurable patch panels.

Often a separate tool known as a spudger is used to remove small stray pieces of cut off wiring stuck within punch-down blocks.

== Reliable connections ==
It is possible to insert wiring without the proper tool, but this requires great care to avoid damaging the connectors. For example, pushing a screwdriver down the middle of the block is a bad practice as it forces the two blades of the terminal post apart, leading to bad contacts. It is also possible to punch down multiple wires on top of each other in a single post of a punch-down block, but this practice is discouraged because of reliability concerns. If these multiple wires are of different thicknesses (wire gauges), it is even more likely that the thinner wire will develop contact problems. Similarly, stranded wire can be used on punch-down blocks, but they are designed for solid wire connections.

Marginal practices like these are strongly discouraged in large or mission-critical installations, because they can introduce extremely troublesome intermittent connections, as well as more-obvious outright bad connections. Once the contact blades in a punchdown block are "sprung apart" by poor practices, the entire block often must be replaced to restore reliable connections.

In addition, punch-down blocks are being used to handle larger numbers of faster data signals, requiring greater care and proper procedures to control impedance and crosstalk.

== Examples ==
- A 66 block (or "M Block") is used in older analog telephone systems.
- A 110 block is often used in residential telephone and Cat 5 wire systems, replacing 66 blocks.
- A Krone block is a proprietary European alternative.
- A BIX block is a proprietary block developed originally by Nortel Networks.

== See also ==
- Main distribution frame
