= On-premises wiring =

Add before construction or break through walls

On-premises wiring (customer premises wiring) is customer-owned transmission or distribution lines. The transmission lines may be metallic (copper) or optical fiber, and may be installed within or between buildings.

Premises wiring may consist of horizontal wiring, vertical wiring, and backbone cabling. It may extend from the point-of-entry to user work areas. Any type of telecommunications or data wiring is considered premises wiring, including telephone, computer/data, intercom, closed-circuit television.

Premises networks are wired worldwide, across every industry, in both small and large-scale applications. Any type or number of topologies may be used – star, bus, ring, etc. In 1989, the United States Federal Communications Commission (FCC) deregulated charges for maintaining at home inside wiring; the corresponding monthly charge was dropped January 1990.

== Ownership ==
The ownership of on-premises wiring varies between jurisdictions: It depends on the location of the demarcation point. The location determines ownership and responsibility for maintenance and repair.

In the United States and Canada, most premises wiring is owned by the customer. There generally is a demarcation point "as close to the poles" as possible. For many installations, this is a network interface device mounted on the outside of the building. In some cases, it is a minimum-point-of-entry (MPOE) location inside the building.

In the United Kingdom, the demarcation point is the wall jack, and hence most of the on-premises wiring is the property of the telephone company.

== See also ==
- Customer-premises equipment
- Demarc extension
- Riser cable
- Structured cabling
