= Patch panel =

Device featuring a number of jacks for connecting and routing circuits

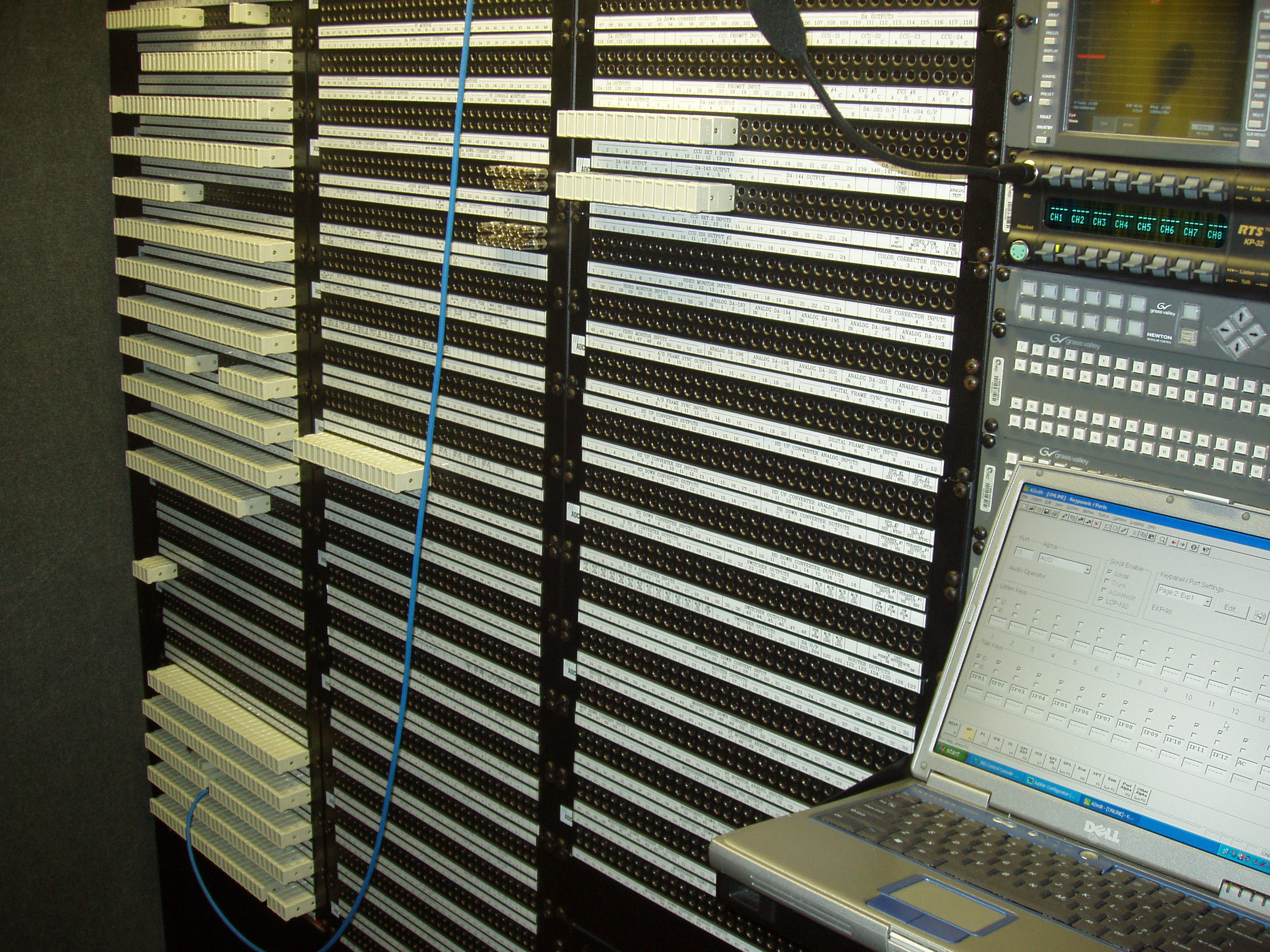
A remote broadcast trailer's jackfield

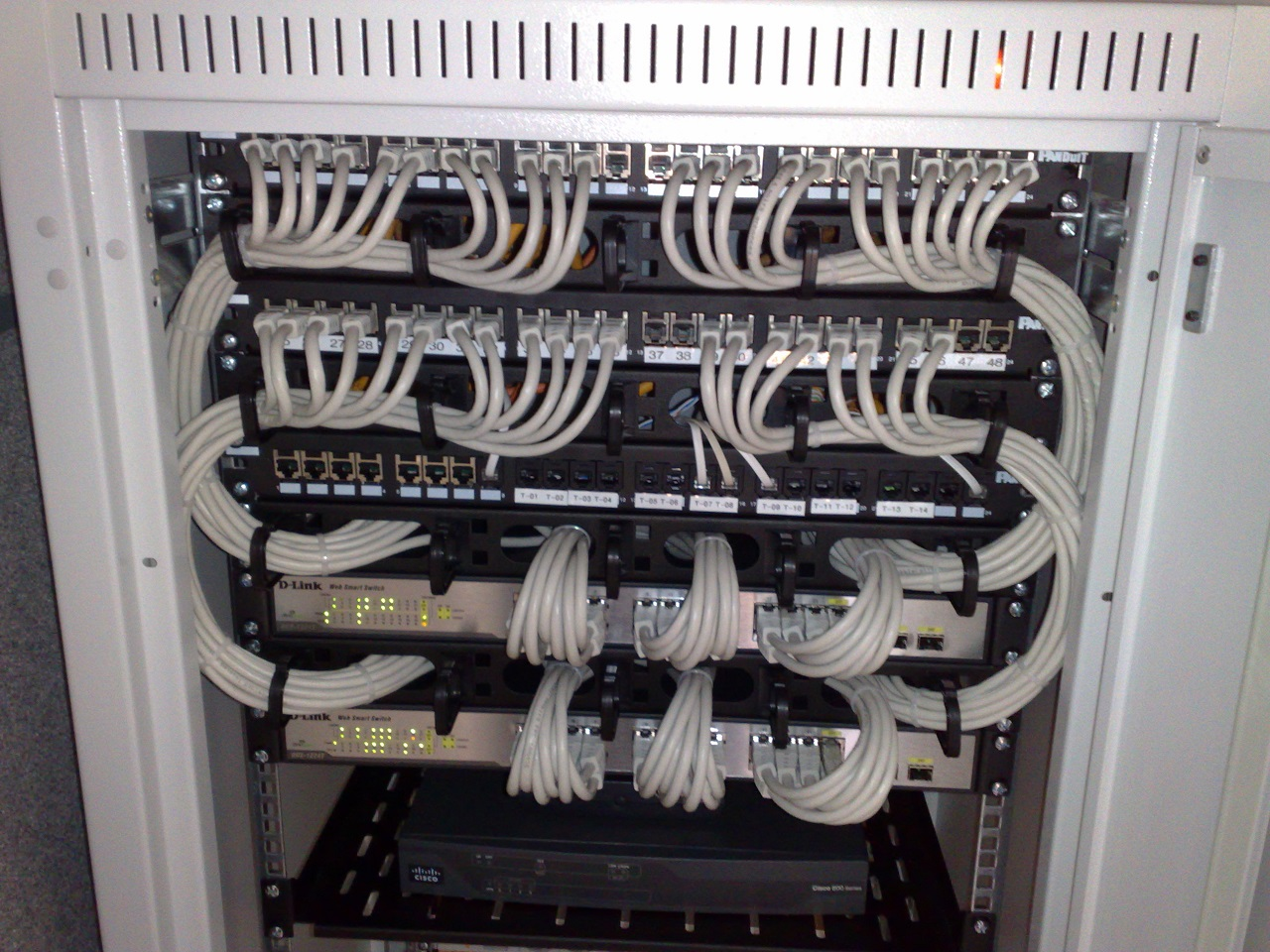
A pair of managed Gigabit Ethernet rack-mount switches, connected to the Ethernet ports on a few Panduit patch panels using Category 6 patch cables. (All equipment is installed in a standard 19-inch rack.)

A patch panel is a device or unit featuring a number of jacks, usually of the same or similar type, for the use of connecting and routing circuits for monitoring, interconnecting, and testing circuits in a convenient, flexible manner. Patch panels are commonly used in computer networking, recording studios, radio and television.

The term patch came from early use in telephony and radio studios, where extra equipment kept on standby could be temporarily substituted for failed devices. This reconnection was done via patch cords and patch panels, like the jack fields of cord-type telephone switchboards.

== Terminology ==
Patch panels are also referred to as patch bays, patch fields, jack panels or jack fields.

== Uses and connectors ==
In recording studios, television and radio broadcast studios, and concert sound reinforcement systems, patchbays are widely used to facilitate the connection of different devices, such as microphones, electric or electronic instruments, effects (e.g. compression, reverb, etc.), recording gear, amplifiers, or broadcasting equipment. Patchbays make it easier to connect different devices in different orders for different projects, because all of the changes can be made at the patchbay. Additionally, patchbays make it easier to troubleshoot problems such as ground loops; even small home studios and amateur project studios often use patchbays, because it groups all of the input jacks into one location. This means that devices mounted in racks or keyboard instruments can be connected without having to hunt around behind the rack or instrument with a flashlight for the right jack. Using a patchbay also saves wear and tear on the input jacks of studio gear and instruments, because all of the connections are made with the patchbay.

Patch panels are being used more prevalently in domestic installations, owing to the popularity of "Structured Wiring" installs.

== Normalization ==
A patch bay for patching circuits to stage lighting instruments

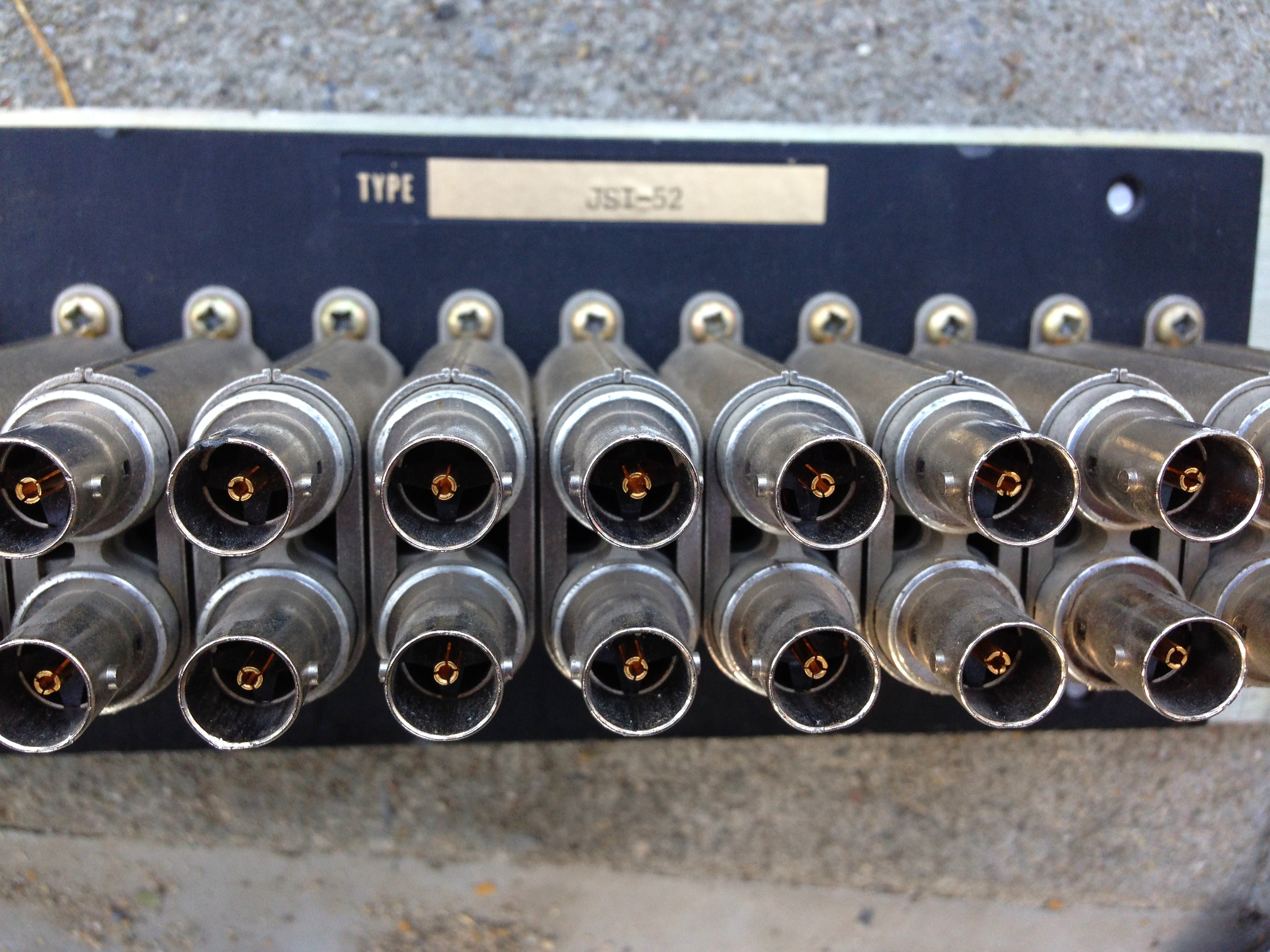
Rear view of a patch panel with dual-coaxial patch jacks

It is conventional to have the top row of jacks wired at the rear to outputs and bottom row of jacks wired to inputs. Patch bays may be half-normal (usually bottom) or full-normal, "normal" indicating that the top and bottom jacks are connected internally. When a patch bay has bottom half-normal wiring, then with no patch cord inserted into either jack, the top jack is internally linked to the bottom jack via break contacts on the bottom jack; inserting a patch cord into the top jack will take a feed off that jack while retaining the internal link between the two jacks; inserting a patch cord into the bottom jack will break the internal link and replace the signal feed from the top jack with the signal carried on the patch cord. With top half-normal wiring, the same happens but vice versa. If a patch bay is wired to full-normal, then it includes break contacts in both rows of jacks.

== Switches ==
Dedicated switching equipment can be an alternative to patch bays in some applications. Switches can make routing as easy as pushing a button, and can provide other benefits over patch bays, including routing a signal to any number of destinations simultaneously. However, switching equipment that can emulate the capabilities of a given patch bay is much more expensive. For example, an S-Video matrix routing switcher with the same capability (8×8) as a 16-point S-Video patch panel (8 patch cables connects 8 inputs and 8 outputs) may cost ten times more, though it would probably have more capabilities.

Like patch panels, switching equipment for nearly any type of signal is available, including analog and digital video and audio, as well as RF (cable TV), MIDI, telephone, networking and electrical. There are various types of switches for audio and video, from simple selector switches to sophisticated production switchers. However, emulating or exceeding the capabilities of audio or video patch panels requires specialized devices like crossbar switches.

Switching equipment may be electronic, mechanical, or electro-mechanical. Some switcher hardware can be controlled via computer or other external devices. Some have automated or pre-programmed operational capabilities. There are also software switcher applications used to route signals and control data within a "pure digital" computer environment.

== See also ==
- Cable management
- Distribution frame
- Pin matrix
- Wiring closet
