= Fiber-optic communication =

Transmitting information over optical fiber

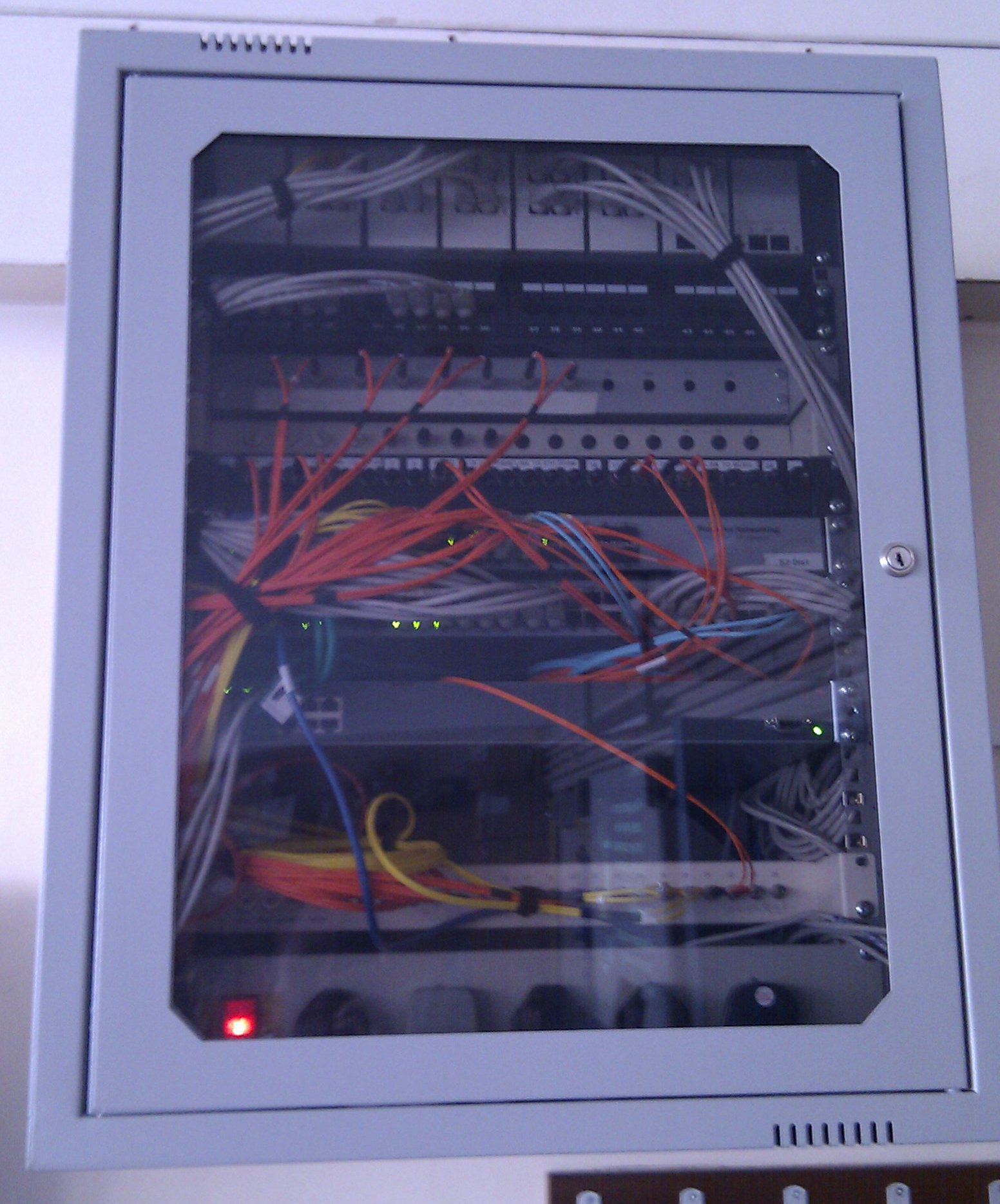
An optical fiber patching cabinet. The yellow cables are single-mode fibers; the orange and blue cables are multi-mode fibers: 62.5/125 μm OM1 and 50/125 μm OM3 fibers, respectively.

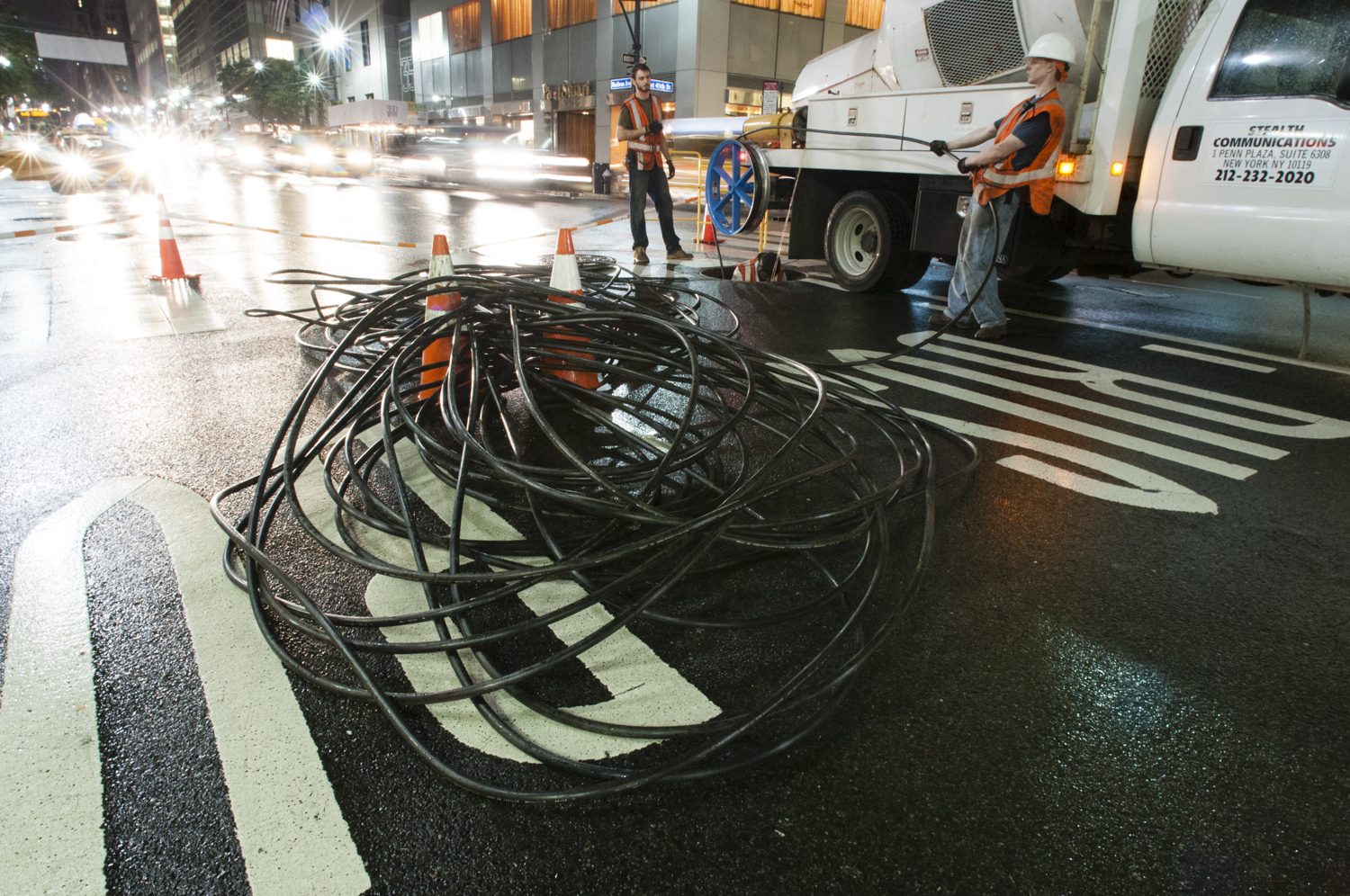
Stealth Communications fiber crew installing a 432-count dark fiber cable underneath the streets of Midtown Manhattan, New York City

Fiber-optic communication is a form of optical communication for transmitting information from one place to another by sending pulses of infrared or visible light through an optical fiber. The light is a form of carrier wave that is modulated to carry information. Optical fiber can carry voice, video, and data through small microprocessor interconnects, longer local area networks, or across distances of thousands of kilometers. Fiber is preferred over electrical cabling when high bandwidth, long distance, low power consumption, or immunity to electromagnetic interference is required.

== Background ==
First developed in the 1970s, fiber-optics have revolutionized the telecommunications industry and played a major role in the advent of the Information Age. Because of advantages over electrical transmission, optical fibers have largely replaced copper wire communications in backbone networks in the developed world.

The process of communicating digital information using fiber optics involves the following basic steps:

1. create the optical signal, usually by using an optical transmitter to convert electrical signals into optical ones
2. relay the signal along optical fiber cables, possibly with help from optical amplifiers
3. receive the optical signal and convert it into an electrical signal

== Applications ==
Optical fiber is used by telecommunications companies to transmit telephone signals, internet communication and cable television signals. It is also used in other industries, including medical, defense, government, industrial and commercial. In addition to serving the purposes of telecommunications, it is used as light guides, for imaging tools, lasers, hydrophones for seismic waves, SONAR, and as sensors to measure pressure and temperature.

Due to lower attenuation and interference, optical fiber has advantages over copper wire in long-distance, high-bandwidth applications. However, infrastructure development within cities is relatively difficult and time-consuming, and fiber-optic systems can be complex and expensive to install and operate. Due to these difficulties, early fiber-optic communication systems were primarily installed in long-distance applications, where they can be used to their full transmission capacity, offsetting the increased cost. The prices of fiber-optic communications have dropped considerably since 2000.

Since 1990, when optical-amplification systems became commercially available, the telecommunications industry has laid a vast network of intercity and transoceanic fiber communication lines. By 2002, an intercontinental network of 250,000 km of submarine communications cable with a capacity of 2.56 Tb/s was completed, and although specific network capacities are privileged information, telecommunications investment reports indicate that network capacity has increased dramatically since 2004. As of 2020, over 5 billion kilometers of fiber-optic cable have been deployed around the globe.

As of 2025, rolling out fiber to the home can be more cost-effective than rolling out a copper-based network when all costs: installation, opex, etc. and "drop" prices are considered. The total cost has dropped below $850 per subscriber in the US and lower in countries like the Netherlands, where digging costs are low and housing density high.

== History ==
In 1880, Alexander Graham Bell and his assistant Charles Sumner Tainter created a very early precursor to fiber-optic communications, the photophone, a device that transmits sound over air using beams of light, at Bell's newly established Volta Laboratory in Washington, D.C.. On June 3, 1880, Bell conducted the world's first wireless telephone transmission between two buildings, some 213 meters apart. While Bell was extremely proud of it, the photophone never caught on and was soon superseded by radio.

In 1954, Harold Hopkins and Narinder Singh Kapany showed that bundles of glass fibers could be used to transmit an image. In 1963, Jun-ichi Nishizawa, a Japanese scientist at Tohoku University, proposed the use of optical fibers for communication.

In 1966, Charles K. Kao and George Hockham at Standard Telecommunication Laboratories showed that the losses of 1,000 dB/km in existing optical fiber glass (compared to 5–10 dB/km in coaxial cable) were due to contaminants which could potentially be removed.

In 1970, optical fiber with attenuation low enough for practical communication purposes (about 20 dB/km) was developed by Corning Glass Works. Simultaneously, GaAs semiconductor lasers were developed that were compact and powerful enough to transmit light through fiber-optic cables over long distances. InGaAsP lasers were subsequently developed, which operate at a wavelength of 1550 nm, where attenuation in optical fiber is lowest.

=== First generation ===
In 1973, Optelecom, Inc., co-founded by the inventor of the laser, Gordon Gould, received a contract from ARPA for one of the first optical communication systems. Developed for defense purposes by Army Missile Command in Huntsville, Alabama, the system was intended to allow a short-range missile with video processing to communicate by laser to the ground by means of a five-kilometer-long optical fiber that unspooled from the missile as it flew. Next, Optelecom delivered the first commercial optical communications system to Chevron.

After a period of research starting from 1975, the first commercial fiber-optic telecommunications system was developed, which operated at a wavelength around 0.8 μm and used GaAs semiconductor lasers. This first-generation system operated at a bit rate of 45 Mbit/s with repeater spacing of up to 10 km. Soon after, on 22 April 1977, General Telephone and Electronics sent the first live telephone traffic through fiber optics at a 6 Mbit/s throughput in Long Beach, California.

In October 1973, Corning Glass signed a development contract with CSELT and Pirelli aimed to test fiber optics in an urban environment: in September 1977, the second cable in this test series, named COS-2, was experimentally deployed in two lines over 9 km in Turin, for the first time in a big city, at a speed of 140 Mbit/s.

=== Second generation ===
In the early 1980s, the second generation of fiber-optic communication was developed for commercial use, operated at 1.3 μm using InGaAsP semiconductor lasers. These early systems were initially limited by multi-mode fiber dispersion, and in 1981 the single-mode fiber was revealed to improve system performance greatly; however, practical connectors capable of working with single-mode fiber proved difficult to develop. Canadian service provider SaskTel had completed construction of what was then the world's longest commercial fiber optic network, which covered 3,268 km (2,031 mi) and linked 52 communities. By 1987, these systems were operating at bit rates of up to 1.7 Gbit/s with repeater spacing up to 50 km (31 mi).

In 1988, the first transatlantic telephone cable to use optical fiber was TAT-8, based on Desurvire optimized laser amplification technology.

=== Third generation ===
In the ealy 1990s, third-generation fiber-optic systems operated at 1.55 μm and had losses of about 0.2 dB/km. This development was spurred by the discovery of indium gallium arsenide and the development of the indium gallium arsenide photodiode by Pearsall. Engineers overcame earlier pulse-spreading difficulties using conventional InGaAsP semiconductor lasers at 1.55 μm by using dispersion-shifted fibers designed to have minimal dispersion at 1.55 μm and limiting the laser spectrum to a single longitudinal mode. These developments eventually allowed third-generation systems to operate commercially at 2.5 Gbit/s with increased repeater spacing in excess of 100 km (62 mi).

=== Fourth generation ===
In the late 1990s, the fourth generation of fiber-optic communication systems used optical amplification to reduce the need for repeaters and wavelength-division multiplexing (WDM) to increase data capacity. The introduction of WDM was the start of optical networking, as WDM became the technology of choice for fiber-optic bandwidth expansion. The first to market with a dense WDM system was Ciena Corp., in June 1996. The introduction of optical amplifiers and WDM caused system capacity to double every six months from 1992 until a bit rate of 10 Tb/s was reached by 2001. In 2006, a bit-rate of 14 Tb/s was reached over a single 160 km (99 mi) line using optical amplifiers. In 2021, Japanese scientists transmitted 319 terabits per second over 3,000 kilometers with four-core fiber cables the same diameter as a standard single-core cable.

=== Fifth generation ===
In the late 1990s through 2000, industry promoters and research companies such as KMI and RHK predicted massive increases in demand for communications bandwidth due to increased use of the Internet, and commercialization of various bandwidth-intensive consumer services, such as video on demand. Internet Protocol data traffic was increasing exponentially, at a faster rate than integrated circuit complexity had increased under Moore's Law. From the bust of the dot-com bubble through 2006, however, the main trend in the industry has been consolidation of firms and offshoring of manufacturing to reduce costs. Companies such as Verizon and AT&T began to take advantage of fiber-optic communications to deliver a variety of high-throughput data and broadband services to consumers' homes.

In the early 2000s, the fifth generation of fiber-optic communication systems extended the wavelength range (bandwidth) over which a WDM system can operate. The standard band is the C band (1525–1565 nm). Dry fiber is used to provide an addtional low-loss window in the L-band, 1565–1625 nm. Other developments include the concept of optical solitons, pulses that preserve their shape by counteracting the effects of dispersion with the nonlinear effects of the fiber by using pulses of a specific shape.

In 2009, researchers at Bell Labs reached a record bandwidth–distance product of over 100 petabit × kilometers per second.

=== Sixth generation ===
In the 2020s, the sixth generation of fiber-optic communication systems will use space-division multiplexing (SDM),

== Technology ==
=== Transmitters ===
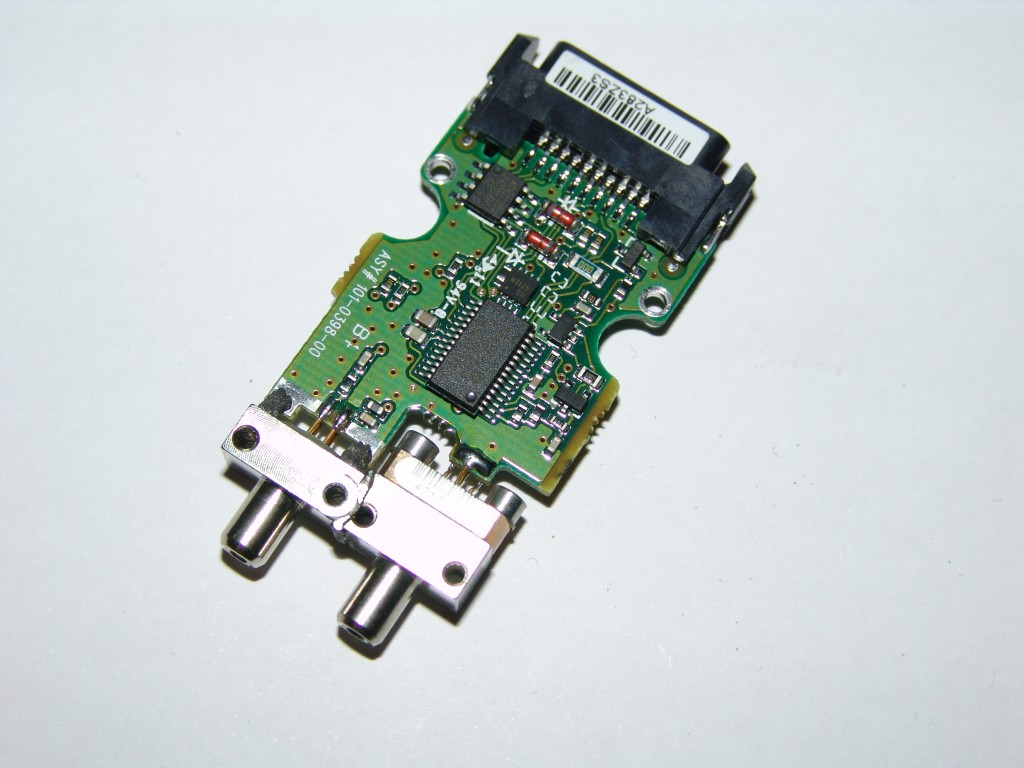
A GBIC module (shown here with its cover removed), is an optical and electrical transceiver, a device combining a transmitter and a receiver in a single housing. The electrical connector is at the top right, and the optical connectors are at bottom left.

The most commonly used optical transmitters are semiconductor devices such as light-emitting diodes (LEDs), laser diodes, and vertical-cavity surface-emitting lasers (VCSELs). The difference between LEDs and laser diodes is that LEDs produce incoherent light, while laser diodes produce coherent light. VCSELs can produce both coherent and incoherent light. For use in optical communications, semiconductor optical transmitters are designed to be compact, efficient and reliable, while operating in an optimal wavelength range and directly modulated at high frequencies.

==== LEDs ====
In its simplest form, an LED emits light through spontaneous emission, a phenomenon referred to as electroluminescence. The emitted light is incoherent with a relatively wide spectral width of 30–60 nm. (Note: Communications LEDs are most commonly made from Indium gallium arsenide phosphide (InGaAsP) or gallium arsenide (GaAs). Because InGaAsP LEDs operate at a longer wavelength than GaAs LEDs (1.3 micrometers vs. 0.81–0.87 micrometers), their output spectrum, while equivalent in energy, is wider in wavelength terms by a factor of about 1.7.) The large spectrum width of LEDs is subject to higher fiber dispersion, considerably limiting their bit rate-distance product (a common measure of usefulness). LEDs are suitable primarily for local-area-network applications with bit rates of 10–100 Mbit/s and transmission distances of a few kilometers.

LED light transmission is inefficient, with only about 1% of input power, or about 100 microwatts, eventually converted into launched power coupled into the optical fiber.

LEDs have been developed that use several quantum wells to emit light at different wavelengths over a broad spectrum and are currently in use for local-area wavelength-division multiplexing (WDM) applications.

To improve upon the size and power requirements of LEDs in optical communications, microLED transmitters have been developed, which pack several hundred small LEDs into a dense array. Each MicroLED transmits at a lower bit rate of 3 Gbps while the whole array transfers data at over 1&nbspTbps. The power consumption is lower than VCSELs at switching fabric distances of up to 7 m.

==== VCSELs ====
For longer distance transmission, LEDs have been largely superseded by vertical-cavity surface-emitting laser (VCSEL) devices, which offer improved speed, power and spectral properties, at a similar cost. However, due to their relatively simple design, LEDs are very useful for very low-cost applications at short distances. Commonly used classes of semiconductor laser transmitters used in fiber optics include VCSEL, Fabry–Pérot and distributed-feedback laser.

A semiconductor laser emits light through stimulated emission rather than spontaneous emission, which results in high output power (~100 mW) as well as other benefits related to the nature of coherent light. The output of a laser is relatively directional, allowing high coupling efficiency (up to ~50%) into single-mode fiber. Common VCSEL devices also couple well to multimode fiber. The narrow spectral width also allows for high bit rates (54 Gb/s, NRZ) since it reduces the effect of chromatic dispersion. Furthermore, semiconductor lasers can be modulated directly at high frequencies (>28 Ghz) because of their short recombination time.

==== Modulation ====
The light sources in transmitters are often directly modulated; that is, the light output is controlled by a current applied directly to the device. For very high data rates or very long-distance links, a laser source may be operated continuous wave, and the light modulated by an external device, an optical modulator, such as an electro-absorption modulator or Mach–Zehnder interferometer. External modulation increases the achievable link distance by eliminating laser chirp, which broadens the linewidth in directly modulated lasers, increasing the chromatic dispersion in the fiber. For very high bandwidth efficiency, coherent modulation can be used to vary the phase of the light in addition to the amplitude, enabling the use of QPSK, QAM, and OFDM. "Dual-polarization quadrature phase shift keying is a modulation format that effectively sends four times as much information as traditional optical transmissions of the same speed."

==== Microlenses ====
The light emitted by semiconductor lasers and LEDs is highly divergent and must be focused to couple it efficiently into single-mode fiber. Microlenses are used to solve the problem and the assembly combining a laser, a microlens and a short length of fiber is packaged to realize a pigtailed laser module. Microlenses can be fabricated in arrays for coupling an array of sources into an array of optical fibers.

=== Receivers ===
The main component of an optical receiver is a photodetector which converts light into electricity using the photoelectric effect. The primary photodetectors for telecommunications are made from Indium gallium arsenide. The photodetector is typically a semiconductor-based photodiode. Several types of photodiodes include p–n photodiodes, p–i–n photodiodes, and avalanche photodiodes. Metal-semiconductor-metal (MSM) photodetectors are also used due to their suitability for circuit integration in regenerators and wavelength-division multiplexers.

Since light may be attenuated and distorted while passing through the fiber, photodetectors are typically coupled with a transimpedance amplifier and a limiting amplifier to produce a digital signal in the electrical domain recovered from the incoming optical signal. Further signal processing, such as clock recovery from data performed by a phase-locked loop may also be applied before the data is passed on.

To recover data modulated with QPSK, QAM, or OFDM, receivers use a local oscillator laser in combination with a pair of hybrid (active and passive component) couplers and four photodetectors (one for each polarization), followed by high-speed ADCs and digital signal processing.

=== Routing ===
Optical fiber networks consist of more than just fiber-optic connections. Data must be routed to the correct destinations. The electronics within switching centers must handle increasingly high bit rates and face cooling challenges as the components generate more heat. The solution is to operate the fastest parts of the data centers using photonics. Optical circuits are faster and generate little heat.

=== Digital predistortion ===
An optical communication system transmitter consists of a digital-to-analog converter (DAC), a driver amplifier and a Mach–Zehnder modulator. The deployment of higher modulation formats (>4-QAM) or higher baud rates (>32 GBd) diminishes the system performance due to linear and non-linear transmitter effects. These effects can be categorized as linear distortions due to DAC bandwidth limitation and transmitter I/Q skew as well as non-linear effects caused by gain saturation in the driver amplifier and the Mach–Zehnder modulator. Digital predistortion counteracts the degrading effects and enables Baud rates up to 56 GBd and modulation formats like 64-QAM and 128-QAM with the commercially available components. The transmitter digital signal processor performs digital predistortion on the input signals using the inverse transmitter model before sending the samples to the DAC.

Older digital predistortion methods only addressed linear effects. Recent publications also consider non-linear distortions. Berenguer et al models the Mach–Zehnder modulator as an independent Wiener system and the DAC and the driver amplifier are modeled by a truncated, time-invariant Volterra series. Khanna et al use a memory polynomial to model the transmitter components jointly. In both approaches, the Volterra series or the memory polynomial coefficients are found using an indirect-learning architecture. Duthel et al records, for each branch of the Mach-Zehnder modulator, several signals at different polarities and phases. The signals are used to calculate the optical field. Cross-correlating in-phase and quadrature fields identifies the timing skew. The frequency response and the non-linear effects are determined by the indirect-learning architecture.

=== Fiber cable types ===
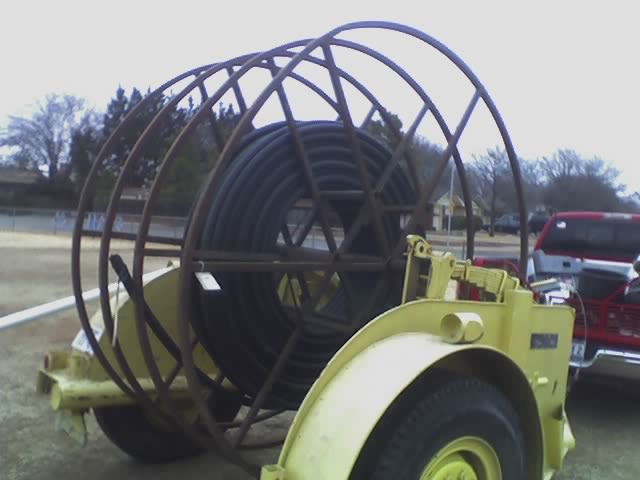
A cable reel trailer with conduit that can carry optical fiber

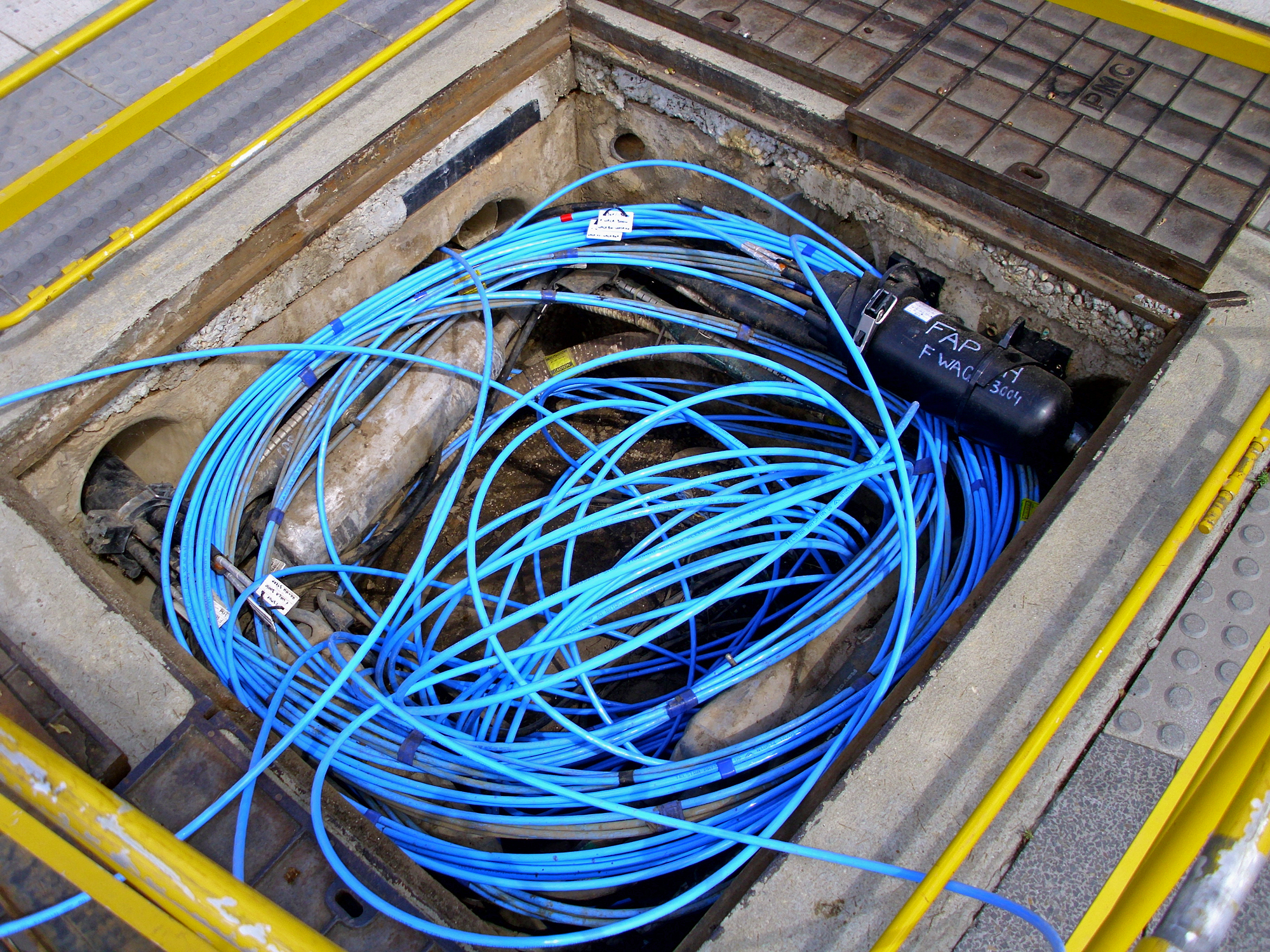
Multi-mode optical fiber in an underground service pit

An optical fiber cable consists of a core, cladding, and a buffer (a protective outer coating), in which the cladding guides the light along the core by using the method of total internal reflection. The core and the cladding (which has a lower-refractive-index) are usually made of high-quality silica glass, although they can both be made of plastic as well with reduced performance and cost. Connecting two optical fibers is done by fusion splicing or mechanical splicing and requires special skills and interconnection technology due to the microscopic precision required to align the fiber cores. Connectors are also used for detachable connection of optical fibers.

Two main types of optical fiber used in optical communications include multi-mode optical fibers and single-mode optical fibers. A multi-mode optical fiber has a larger core (≥ 50 micrometers), allowing less precise, less expensive transmitters and receivers to connect to it as well as cheaper connectors. However, a multi-mode fiber introduces multimode distortion, which often limits the bandwidth and length of the link. Furthermore, because of their higher dopant content, multi-mode fibers are usually expensive and exhibit higher attenuation. The core of a single-mode fiber is smaller (< 10 micrometers) and requires more expensive components and interconnection methods, but allows much longer and higher-performance links. Both single- and multi-mode fibers are offered in different grades.

Comparison of fiber grades
Fibre type	Introduced	Performance
MMF FDDI 62.5/125 µm	1987	160 MHz·km @ 850 nm
MMF OM1 62.5/125 µm	1989	200 MHz·km @ 850 nm
MMF OM2 50/125 µm	1998	500 MHz·km @ 850 nm
MMF OM3 50/125 µm	2003	1500 MHz·km @ 850 nm
MMF OM4 50/125 µm	2008	3500 MHz·km @ 850 nm
MMF OM5 50/125 µm	2016	3500 MHz·km @ 850 nm and 1850 MHz·km @ 950 nm
SMF OS1 9/125 µm	1998	1.0 dB/km @ 1300/1550 nm
SMF OS2 9/125 µm	2000	0.4 dB/km @ 1300/1550 nm

When packaging fiber into a commercially viable product, fiber is typically protectively coated by using ultraviolet-cured acrylate polymers, polymides, or silicones to improve resistance to environmental factors and mechanical damage. The coated fiber is then assembled into a cable. After cable construction, the cable can be laid in the ground, or run through the walls of a building, or deployed aerially in a manner similar to copper cables. Optical fibers can require less maintenance than common twisted pair wires once they are deployed.

Specialized cables are used for long-distance subsea data transmission, e.g., transatlantic communications cable. As of 2013, new cables operated by commercial enterprises (Emerald Atlantis, Hibernia Atlantic) typically have four strands of fiber and signals cross the Atlantic (NYC-London) in 60–70 ms. The cost of each such cable was about $300 million in 2011.

Another common practice is to bundle many fiber optic strands within long-distance power transmission cable using, for instance, an optical ground wire. This exploits power transmission rights of way effectively, ensures a power company can own and control the fiber required to monitor its own devices and lines, is effectively immune to tampering, and simplifies the deployment of smart grid technology.

=== Plastic fibers ===
Current optical fibers for long-distance communication are based on silica. Plastics and other types of glass exhibit much higher optical attenuation and are unsuitable for this application. Plastic optical fiber (POF) made of PMMA or polycarbonate is attractive for shorter distances and where highly flexible cables are required. POF can be bent sharply and facilitates easy installation and connections because the core is relatively thick, up to 1 mm.

Perfluorinated graded-index polymer optical fiber (GIPOF) has been developed that has lower attenuation at common telecommunications wavelengths. Researchers have demonstrated transmission at 11 Gbit/s over up to 100 m with this fiber. This is sufficient for applications in buildings and data centers. GIPOF typically has a core diameter of between 50 and 120 microns.

=== Amplification ===
The transmission distance of a fiber-optic communication system has traditionally been limited by fiber attenuation and by fiber distortion. By using optoelectronic repeaters, these problems have been eliminated. These repeaters convert the signal into an electrical signal and then use a transmitter to send the signal again at a higher intensity than was received, thus counteracting the loss incurred in the previous segment. Because of the high complexity of modern wavelength-division multiplexed signals, including the fact that they had to be installed about once every 20 km (12 mi), the cost of these repeaters is very high.

An alternative approach is to use optical amplifiers, which amplify the optical signal directly without having to convert the signal to the electrical domain. One common type of optical amplifier is an erbium-doped fiber amplifier (EDFA). These are made by doping a length of fiber with the rare-earth mineral erbium and laser pumping it with light with a shorter wavelength than the communications signal (typically 980 nm). EDFAs provide gain in the ITU C band at 1550 nm. For the same band, semiconductor optical amplifiers (SOA) can be used.

Praseodymium-doped optical fiber amplifiers (PDFA) are suitable for the 1280–1350 nm wavelength range. In an experiment involving eight 100 Gbit/s signals, more than 30 dB of gain was demonstrated across all channels. Semiconductor optical amplifiers (SOA) have been used in a record experiment for the wavelength range around 1300 nm.

Optical amplifiers have several significant advantages over electrical repeaters. First, an optical amplifier can amplify a very wide band at once, which can include hundreds of multiplexed channels, eliminating the need to demultiplex signals at each amplifier. Second, optical amplifiers operate independently of the data rate and modulation format, enabling multiple data rates and modulation formats to co-exist and enabling upgrading of the data rate of a system without having to replace all of the repeaters. Third, optical amplifiers are much simpler than a repeater with the same capabilities and are therefore significantly more reliable. Optical amplifiers have largely replaced repeaters in new installations, although electronic repeaters are still widely used when signal conditioning beyond amplification is required.

=== Wavelength-division multiplexing ===
Wavelength-division multiplexing (WDM) is the technique of transmitting multiple channels of information through a single optical fiber by sending multiple light beams of different wavelengths through the fiber, each modulated with a separate information channel. This allows the available capacity of optical fibers to be multiplied. This requires a wavelength-division multiplexer in the transmitting equipment and a demultiplexer (essentially a spectrometer) in the receiving equipment. Arrayed waveguide gratings are commonly used for multiplexing and demultiplexing in WDM. Using WDM technology now commercially available, the bandwidth of a fiber can be divided into as many as 160 channels to support a combined bit rate in the range of 1.6 Tbit/s.

== Parameters ==
=== Bandwidth–distance product ===
Because the effect of dispersion increases with the length of the fiber, a fiber transmission system is often characterized by its bandwidth–distance product, usually expressed in units of MHz·km. This value is a product of bandwidth and distance because there is a trade-off between the bandwidth of the signal and the distance over which it can be carried. For example, a common multi-mode fiber with a bandwidth–distance product of 500 MHz·km could carry a 500 MHz signal for 1 km or a 1000 MHz signal for 0.5 km.

=== Record speeds ===
Using wavelength-division multiplexing, each fiber can carry many independent channels, each using a different wavelength of light. The net data rate (data rate without overhead bytes) per fiber is the per-channel data rate reduced by the forward error correction (FEC) overhead, multiplied by the number of channels (usually up to eighty in commercial dense WDM systems as of 2008). A record of 102 petabit/s over 1808 km has been reported in 2025.

==== Standard fiber cables ====
The following summarizes research using standard telecoms-grade single-mode, single-solid-core fiber cables.

Year	Organization	Aggregate speed	Bandwidth	Spectral efficiency, (bit/s)/Hz	WDM channels	Per-channel speed	Distance
2009	Alcatel-Lucent	15.5 Tbit/s			155	100 Gbit/s	7000 km
2010	NTT	69.1 Tbit/s			432	171 Gbit/s	240 km
2011	NEC	101.7 Tbit/s			370	273 Gbit/s	165 km
2011	KIT	26 Tbit/s			336 (Note: Used a single source to drive all channels.)	77 Gbit/s	50 km
2016	BT & Huawei	5.6 Tbit/s			28	200 Gbit/s	~140 km?
2016	Nokia Bell Labs, Deutsche Telekom & Technical University of Munich	1 Tbit/s		5–6.75	4	250 Gbit/s	419–951 km
2016	Nokia-Alcatel-Lucent	65 Tbit/s					6600 km
2017	BT & Huawei	11.2 Tbit/s		6.25	28	400 Gbit/s	250 km
2020	RMIT, Monash & Swinburne Universities	39.0–40.1 Tbit/s	~4 THz	10.4 (10.1–10.4)	160	244 Gbit/s	76.6 km
2020	UCL	178.08 Tbit/s	16.83 THz	10.8	660 (S, C, L bands)	270 Gbit/s	40 km
2023	NICT	301 Tbit/s	27.8 THz	10.8	1097 (E, S, C, L bands)	250–300 Gbit/s	50–150 km
2024	NICT	402 Tbit/s	37.6 THz	10.7	1505 (O, E, S, C, L, U bands)	170–320 Gbit/s	50 km

==== Specialized cables ====
The following table summarizes results achieved using specialized multicore or multimode fiber.

Year	Organization	Aggregate speed	Per core speed	Bandwidth	Spectral efficiency, (bit/s)/Hz	No. of propagation modes	No. of cores	WDM channels (per core)	Per channel speed	Distance
2011	NICT	109.2 Tbit/s	15.6 Tbit/s				7			
2012	NEC, Corning	1.05 Pbit/s	87.5 Tbit/s				12			52.4 km
2013	University of Southampton	73.7 Tbit/s	73.7 Tbit/s				1 (hollow)	3 × 96 (mode DM)	256 Gbit/s	310 m
2014	Technical University of Denmark	43 Tbit/s	6.14 Tbit/s				7			1045 km
2014	Eindhoven University of Technology (TU/e) and University of Central Florida (CREOL)	255 Tbit/s	36.4 Tbit/s				7	50	~728 Gbit/s	1 km
2015	NICT, Sumitomo Electric and RAM Photonics	2.15 Pbit/s	97.7 Tbit/s				22	402 (C, L bands)	243 Gbit/s	31 km
2017	NTT	1 Pbit/s	31.25 Tbit/s			single-mode	32	46	680 Gbit/s	205.6 km
2017	KDDI Research and Sumitomo Electric	10.16 Pbit/s	535 Tbit/s			6-mode	19	739 (C, L bands)	120 Gbit/s	11.3 km
2018	NICT	159 Tbit/s	159 Tbit/s			tri-mode	1	348	414 Gbit/s	1045 km
2020	NICT	10.66 Pbit/s	280.5 Tbit/s	9.2 THz	30.5	tri-mode	38	368 (C, L bands)	762 Gbit/s	13 km
2021	NICT	319 Tbit/s	79.8 Tbit/s			single-mode	4	552 (S, C, L bands)	144.5 Gbit/s	3001 km (69.8 km)
2022	NICT	1.02 Pbit/s	255 Tbit/s				4	801 (S, C, L bands)		51.7 km
2022 (Note: New record for throughput using a photonic chip.)	Technical University of Denmark	1.84 Pbit/s	49.7 Tbit/s				37	223	223 Gbit/s	7.9 km
2022	NICT	1.53 Pbit/s	1.53 Pbit/s	4.6 THz	332	55 (110-MIMO multiplexer)	1	184 (C-band)	1.03 Tbit/s	25.9 km
2023	NICT	22.9 Pbit/s	603 Tbit/s	18.8 THz	32	tri-mode	38	750 (S, C, L bands)	803.5 Gbit/s	13 km

==== New techniques ====
Research from DTU, Fujikura and NTT is notable in that the team was able to reduce the power consumption of the optics to around 5% compared with more mainstream techniques, which could lead to a new generation of very power-efficient optic components.

Year	Organization	Effective speed	No. of Propagation Modes	No. of cores	WDM channels (per core)	Per channel speed	Distance
2018	Hao Hu, et al. (DTU, Fujikura & NTT)	768 Tbit/s (661 Tbit/s)	Single-mode	30	80	320 Gbit/s	

Research conducted by RMIT University, Melbourne, Australia, has developed a nanophotonic device that carries data on light waves that have been twisted into a spiral form and achieved a 100-fold increase in current attainable fiber optic speeds. The technique is known as orbital angular momentum (OAM). The nanophotonic device uses ultra-thin sheets to measure a fraction of a millimeter of twisted light. A nano-electronic device is embedded within a connector smaller than the size of a USB connector and may be fitted at the end of an optical fiber cable.

=== Dispersion ===
For modern glass optical fiber, the maximum transmission distance is limited not by direct material absorption but by dispersion, the spreading of optical pulses as they travel along the fiber. Dispersion limits the bandwidth of the fiber because the spreading optical pulse limits the rate at which pulses can follow one another on the fiber and still be distinguishable at the receiver. Dispersion in optical fibers is caused by a variety of factors.

Intermodal dispersion, caused by the different axial speeds of different transverse modes, limits the performance of multi-mode fiber. Because single-mode fiber supports only one transverse mode, intermodal dispersion is eliminated.

In single-mode fiber, performance is primarily limited by chromatic dispersion, which occurs because the index of the glass varies slightly depending on the wavelength of the light, and, due to modulation, light from optical transmitters necessarily occupies a (narrow) range of wavelengths. Polarization mode dispersion, another source of limitation, occurs because although the single-mode fiber can sustain only one transverse mode, it can carry this mode with two different polarizations, and slight imperfections or distortions in a fiber can alter the propagation velocities for the two polarizations. This phenomenon is called birefringence and can be counteracted by polarization-maintaining optical fiber.

Some dispersion, notably chromatic dispersion, can be removed by a dispersion compensator. This works by using a specially prepared length of fiber that has the opposite dispersion to that induced by the transmission fiber, and this sharpens the pulse so that it can be correctly decoded by the electronics.

=== Attenuation ===
Fiber attenuation is caused by a combination of material absorption, Rayleigh scattering, Mie scattering, and losses in connectors. Material absorption for pure silica is only around 0.03 dB/km. Impurities in early optical fibers caused attenuation of about 1000 dB/km. Modern fiber has attenuation around 0.3 dB/km. Other forms of attenuation are caused by physical stresses to the fiber, microscopic fluctuations in density, and imperfect splicing techniques.

=== Transmission windows ===
Each effect that contributes to attenuation and dispersion depends on the optical wavelength. There are wavelength bands (or windows) where these effects are weakest, and these are the most favorable for transmission. These windows have been standardized.

Standard bands for optical fiber communications
Band	Description	Wavelength range
O band	Original	1260–1360 nm
E band	Extended	1360–1460 nm
S band	Short wavelengths	1460–1530 nm
C band	Conventional (erbium window)	1530–1565 nm
L band	Long wavelengths	1565–1625 nm
U band	Ultralong wavelengths	1625–1675 nm

Note that this table shows that current technology has managed to bridge the E and S windows that were originally disjoint.

Historically, there was a window of wavelengths shorter than O band, called the first window, at 800–900 nm; however, losses are high in this region so this window is used primarily for short-distance communications. The current lower windows (O and E) around 1300 nm have much lower losses. This region has zero dispersion. The middle windows (S and C) around 1500 nm are the most widely used. This region has the lowest attenuation losses and achieves the longest range. It does have some dispersion, so dispersion compensator devices are used to address this.

=== Regeneration ===
When a communications link must span a larger distance than existing fiber-optic technology is capable of, the signal must be regenerated at intermediate points in the link by optical communications repeaters. Repeaters add substantial cost to a communication system, and so system designers attempt to minimize their use.

Recent advances in fiber and optical communications technology have reduced signal degradation to the point that regeneration of the optical signal is only needed over distances of hundreds of kilometers. This has greatly reduced the cost of optical networking, particularly over undersea spans where the cost and reliability of repeaters is one of the key factors determining the performance of the whole cable system. The main advances contributing to these performance improvements are dispersion management, which seeks to balance the effects of dispersion against non-linearity; and solitons, which use nonlinear effects in the fiber to enable dispersion-free propagation over long distances.

=== Last mile ===
Although fiber-optic systems excel in high-bandwidth applications, the last mile problem remains unsolved as fiber to the premises has experienced slow uptake. However, fiber to the home (FTTH) deployment has accelerated. In Japan, for instance, EPON has largely replaced DSL as a broadband Internet source. The largest FTTH deployments are in Japan, South Korea, and China. Singapore started implementation of its all-fiber Next Generation Nationwide Broadband Network (Next Gen NBN), which is slated for completion in 2012 and is being installed by OpenNet. Since they began rolling out services in September 2010, network coverage in Singapore has reached 85% nationwide.

In the US, Verizon Communications provides an FTTH service called FiOS to selected high-average-revenue-per-user markets within its existing territory. The other major surviving incumbent local exchange carrier, AT&T, uses a fiber to the node (FTTN) service called U-verse with twisted-pair to the home. Their MSO competitors employ FTTN with coax using hybrid fiber-coaxial networks. All of the major access networks use fiber for the bulk of the distance from the service provider's network to the customer.

The globally dominant access network technology is Ethernet passive optical network (EPON). In Europe, and among telcos in the United States, ATM-based Broadband PON (BPON) and Gigabit PON (GPON) had roots in the Full Service Access Network (FSAN) and ITU-T standards organizations under their control.

== Comparison with electrical transmission ==
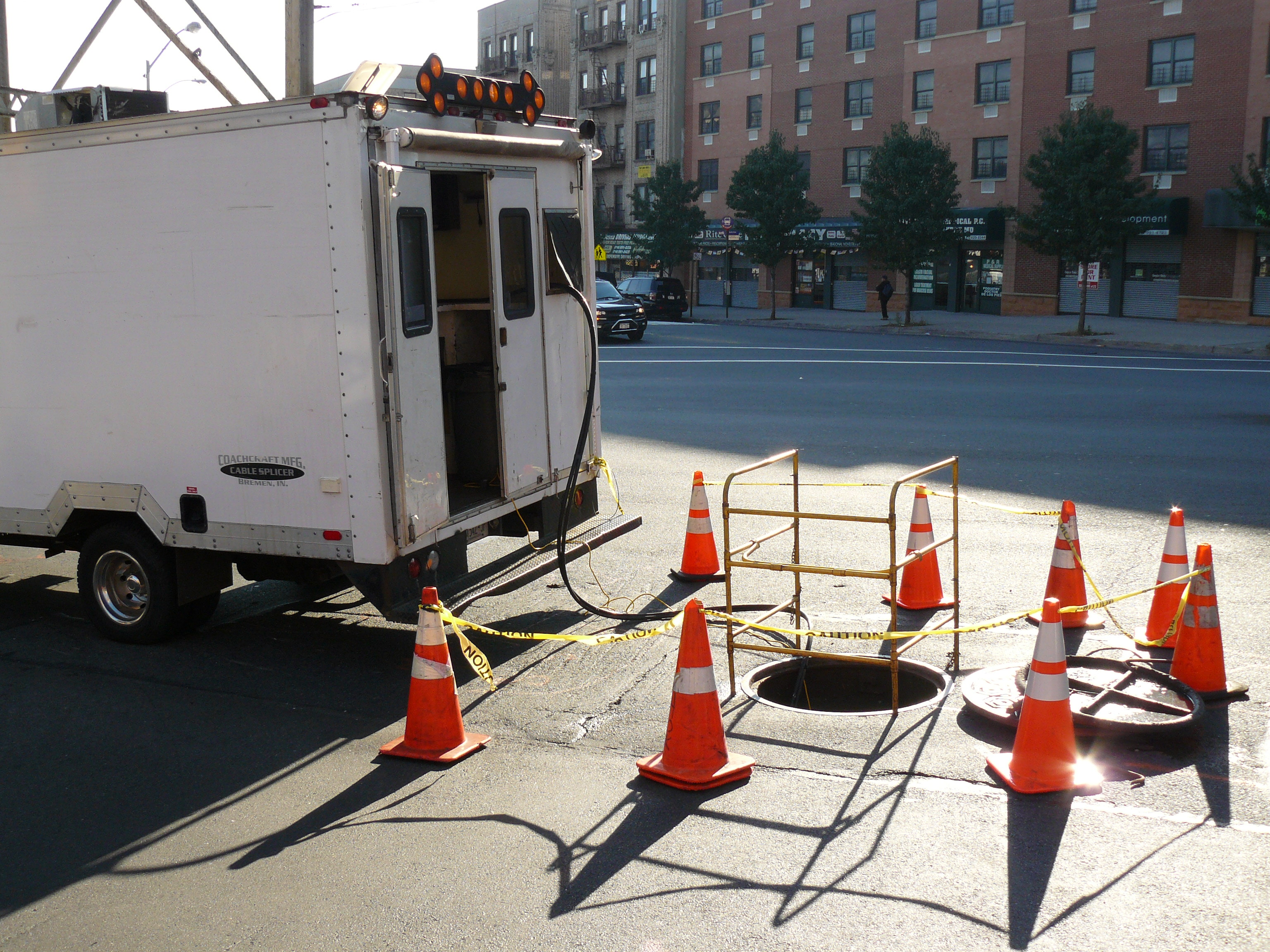
A mobile fiber optic splice lab used to access and splice underground cables

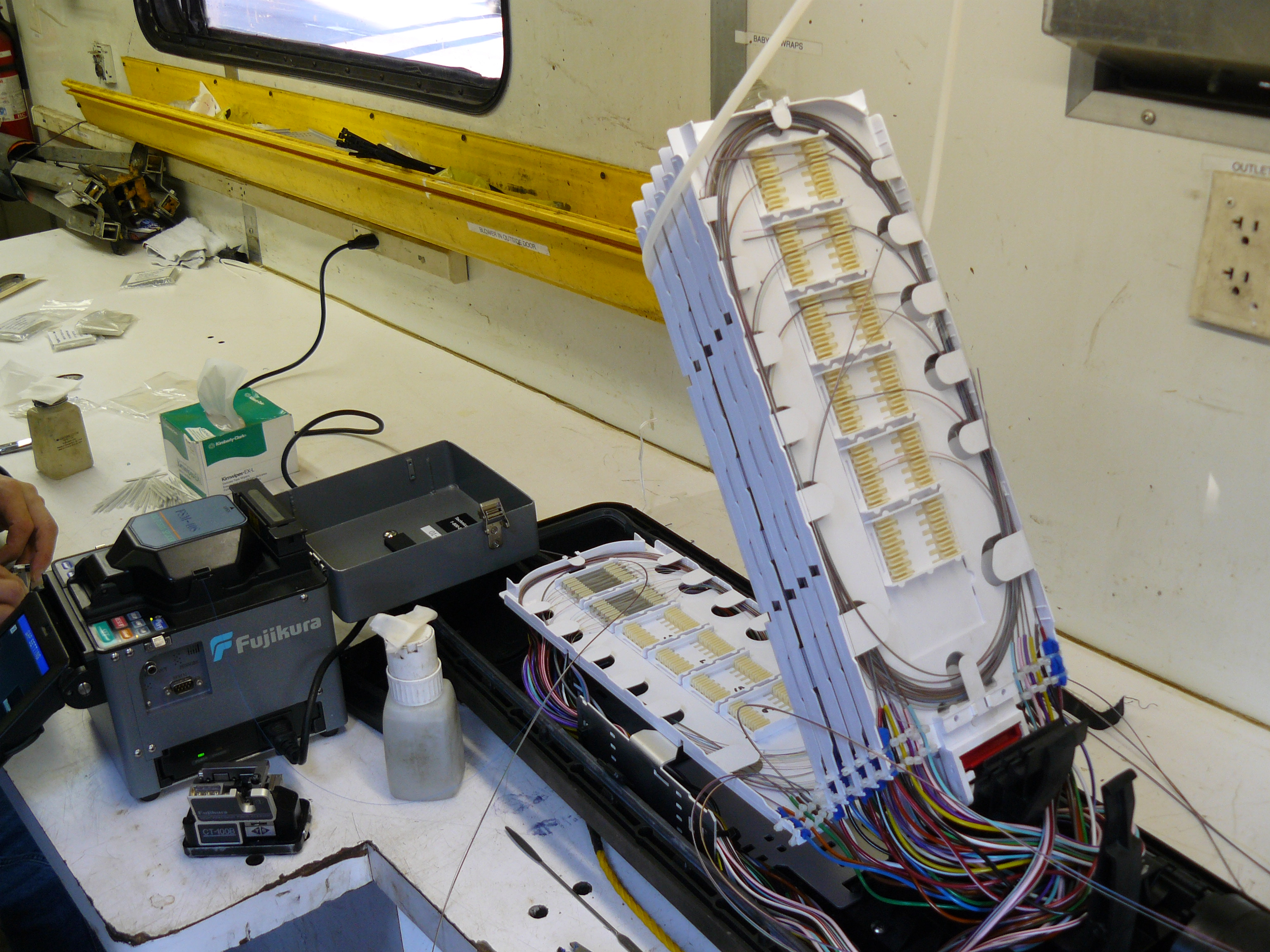
An underground fiber optic splice enclosure opened up

The choice between optical fiber and electrical (or copper) transmission for a particular system is made based on a number of trade-offs. Optical fiber is generally chosen for systems requiring higher bandwidth, operating in harsh environments or spanning longer distances than electrical cabling can accommodate.

The main benefits of fiber are its exceptionally low loss (allowing long distances between repeaters), its absence of ground currents and other parasitic signals and power issues common to long parallel electric conductor runs (due to its reliance on light rather than electricity for transmission, and the dielectric nature of fiber optic), and its inherently high data-carrying capacity. Thousands of electrical links would be required to replace a single high-bandwidth fiber cable. Another benefit of fibers is that even when run alongside each other for long distances, fiber cables experience effectively no crosstalk, in contrast to some types of electrical transmission lines. Fiber can be installed in areas with high electromagnetic interference (EMI), such as alongside power lines, and railroad tracks. Nonmetallic all-dielectric cables are also ideal for areas of high lightning-strike incidence.

For comparison, while single-line, voice-grade copper systems longer than a couple of kilometers require in-line signal repeaters for satisfactory performance, it is not unusual for optical systems to go over 100 kilometers (62 mi), with no active or passive processing.

Optical fibers are more difficult and expensive to splice than electrical conductors. And at higher powers, optical fibers are susceptible to fiber fuse, resulting in catastrophic destruction of the fiber core and damage to transmission components.

In short-distance and relatively low-bandwidth applications, electrical transmission is often preferred because of its lower cost. Optical communication is not common in short box-to-box, backplane, or chip-to-chip applications.

In certain situations, fiber may be used even for short-distance or low-bandwidth applications, due to other important features:

- Immunity to electromagnetic interference, including nuclear electromagnetic pulses.
- High electrical resistance, making it safe to use near high-voltage equipment or between areas with different earth potentials.
- Lighter weight—important, for example, in aircraft.
- No potential for arcing—important in flammable or explosive gas environments.
- Not electromagnetically radiating, and difficult to tap without disrupting the signal—important in high-security environments.
- Much smaller cable size—important where the pathway is limited, such as networking an existing building, where smaller channels can be drilled and space can be saved in existing cable ducts and trays.
- Resistance to corrosion due to non-metallic transmission medium

Optical fiber cables can be installed in buildings using the same equipment that is used to install copper and coaxial cables, with some modifications due to the small size and limited allowable pull tension and bend radius of optical cables.

=== Quantum encryption ===
This method eliminates the need for traditional security codes. Unlike classical cryptographic techniques, quantum encryption is theoretically secure because any attempt at eavesdropping can be detected immediately. The technology has advanced to the point where practical field trials are being conducted. A test network has been established in Eindhoven that connects locations including the TU Eindhoven campus, High Tech Campus Eindhoven and WeConnect in Waalre.

== Governing standards ==
In order for various manufacturers to be able to develop components that function compatibly in fiber optic communication systems, a number of standards have been developed. The International Telecommunication Union publishes several standards related to the characteristics and performance of fibers themselves, including

- ITU-T G.651, "Characteristics of a 50/125 μm multimode graded index optical fibre cable"
- ITU-T G.652, "Characteristics of a single-mode optical fibre cable"

Other standards specify performance criteria for fiber, transmitters, and receivers to be used together in conforming systems. Some of these standards are:

- 100 Gigabit Ethernet
- 10 Gigabit Ethernet
- Fibre Channel
- Gigabit Ethernet
- HIPPI
- Synchronous Digital Hierarchy
- Synchronous Optical Networking
- Optical transport network (OTN)

TOSLINK is the most common format for digital audio cable using plastic optical fiber to connect digital sources to digital receivers. Polymer optical fibers are described in the IEC (International Electrotechnical Commission) standard 6073-2-40.

== See also ==
- Free-space optical communication
