= G.655 =

ITU-T Recommendation

- Status: In force
- Year started: 1996
- Latest version: (11/09); November 2009
- Organization: ITU-T
- Committee: Study Group 15
- Related standards: G.651.1, G.652, G.657
- Domain: telecommunication
- License: Freely available
- Website: https://www.itu.int/rec/T-REC-G.655

G.655 is an international standard that describes the geometrical, mechanical, and transmission attributes of a single-mode optical fibre and cable, developed by the Standardization Sector of the International Telecommunication Union (ITU-T) that specifies one of the most popular types of single-mode optical fiber (SMF) cable.

== Standard ==
The standard specifies the geometrical, mechanical, and transmission attributes of a single-mode optical fibre as well as its cable. The range of mode field diameter permitted in G.655 is 8 to 11 μm in non-zero dispersion-shifted fibre (NZ-DSF). G.655.C fibre has a maximum PMD link design value of 0.20 ps/sqrtkm, which is the lowest value recommended by ITU-T. G.655 has the cable cut-off wavelength and cable attenuation coefficients in the C and L bands.

Large effective area fiber (LEAF) optical fiber is an example of G.655 commonly called NZ-DSF.
