= Gigabit Ethernet =

Standard for Ethernet networking at a data rate of 1 gigabit per second

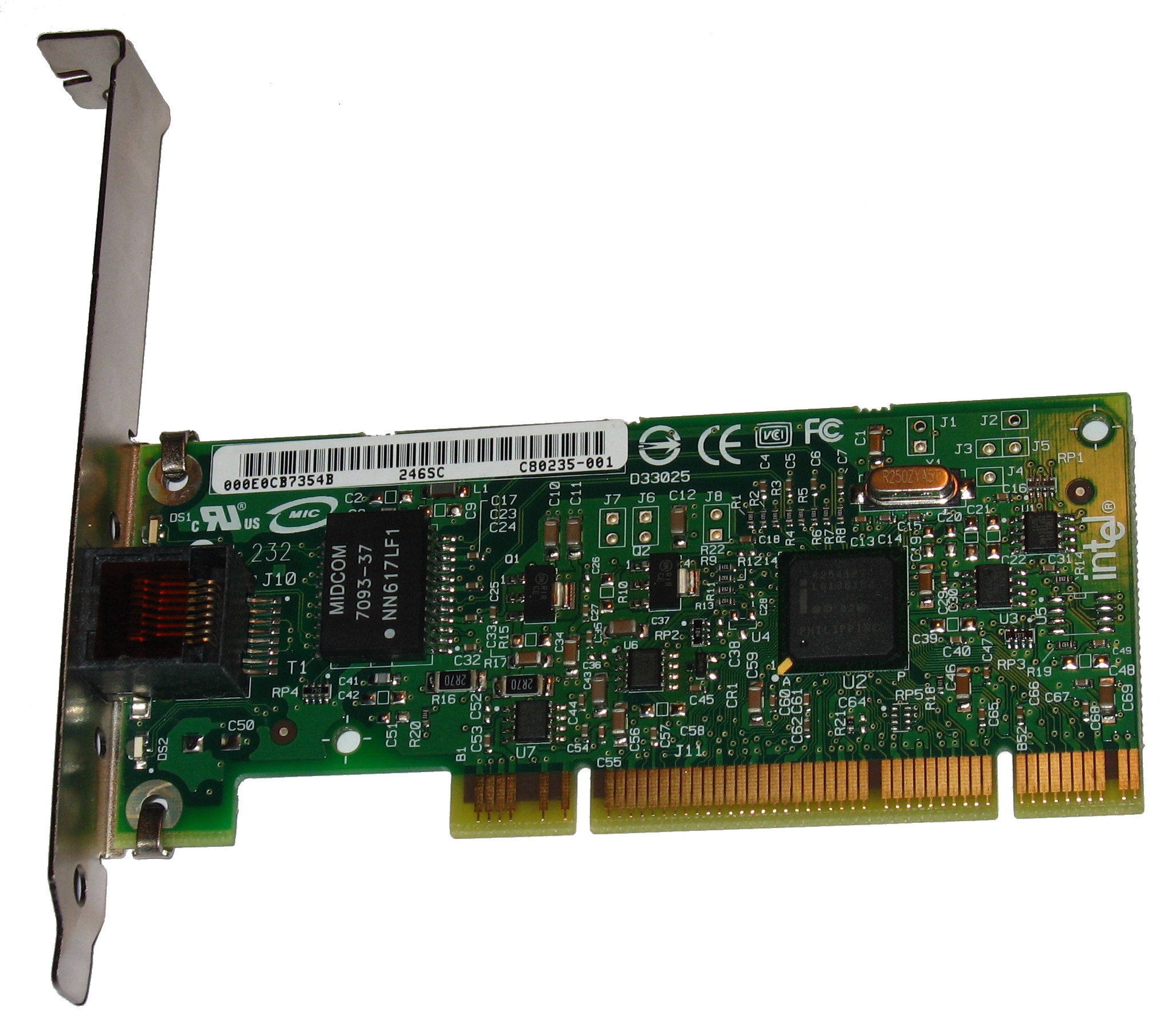
Intel PRO/1000 GT PCI network interface controller

In computer networking, Gigabit Ethernet (GbE or 1 GigE) is the transmission of Ethernet frames at a rate of a gigabit per second. The most popular variant, 1000BASE-T, is defined by the IEEE 802.3ab standard. It came into use in 1999 and has largely replaced Fast Ethernet in wired local networks due to its considerable speed improvement over Fast Ethernet, as well as its use of cables and equipment that are widely available, economical, and similar to previous standards.

The first standard for faster 10 Gigabit Ethernet was approved in 2002.

== History ==
Ethernet was the result of research conducted at Xerox PARC in the early 1970s, and later evolved into a widely implemented physical and link layer protocol. Fast Ethernet increased the speed from 10 to 100 megabits per second (Mbit/s). Gigabit Ethernet was the next iteration, increasing the speed to 1000 Mbit/s.

The initial standard for Gigabit Ethernet was produced by the IEEE in June 1998 as IEEE 802.3z, and required optical fiber. 802.3z is commonly referred to as 1000BASE-X, where -X refers to either -CX, -SX, -LX, or (non-standard) -ZX. (Note: For the history behind the "X" see Fast Ethernet § Nomenclature.) IEEE 802.3ab, ratified in 1999, defines Gigabit Ethernet transmission over unshielded twisted pair (UTP) category 5, 5e or 6 cabling, and became known as 1000BASE-T. With the ratification of 802.3ab, Gigabit Ethernet became a desktop technology as organizations could use their existing copper cabling infrastructure. IEEE 802.3ah, ratified in 2004, added two more GbE fiber standards: 1000BASE-LX10 (which was already widely implemented as a vendor-specific extension) and 1000BASE-BX10. This was part of a larger group of protocols known as Ethernet in the first mile.

Initially, Gigabit Ethernet was deployed in high-capacity backbone network links (for instance, on a high-capacity campus network). In 2000 and 2001, Apple's Power Mac G4 and PowerBook G4 respectively were the first mass-produced personal computers to feature the 1000BASE-T connection. It quickly became a built-in feature in many other computers.

Half-duplex GbE links connected through repeater hubs were part of the IEEE specification, but the specification has not been maintained and full-duplex operation with switches is, in practice, used exclusively.

== Varieties ==
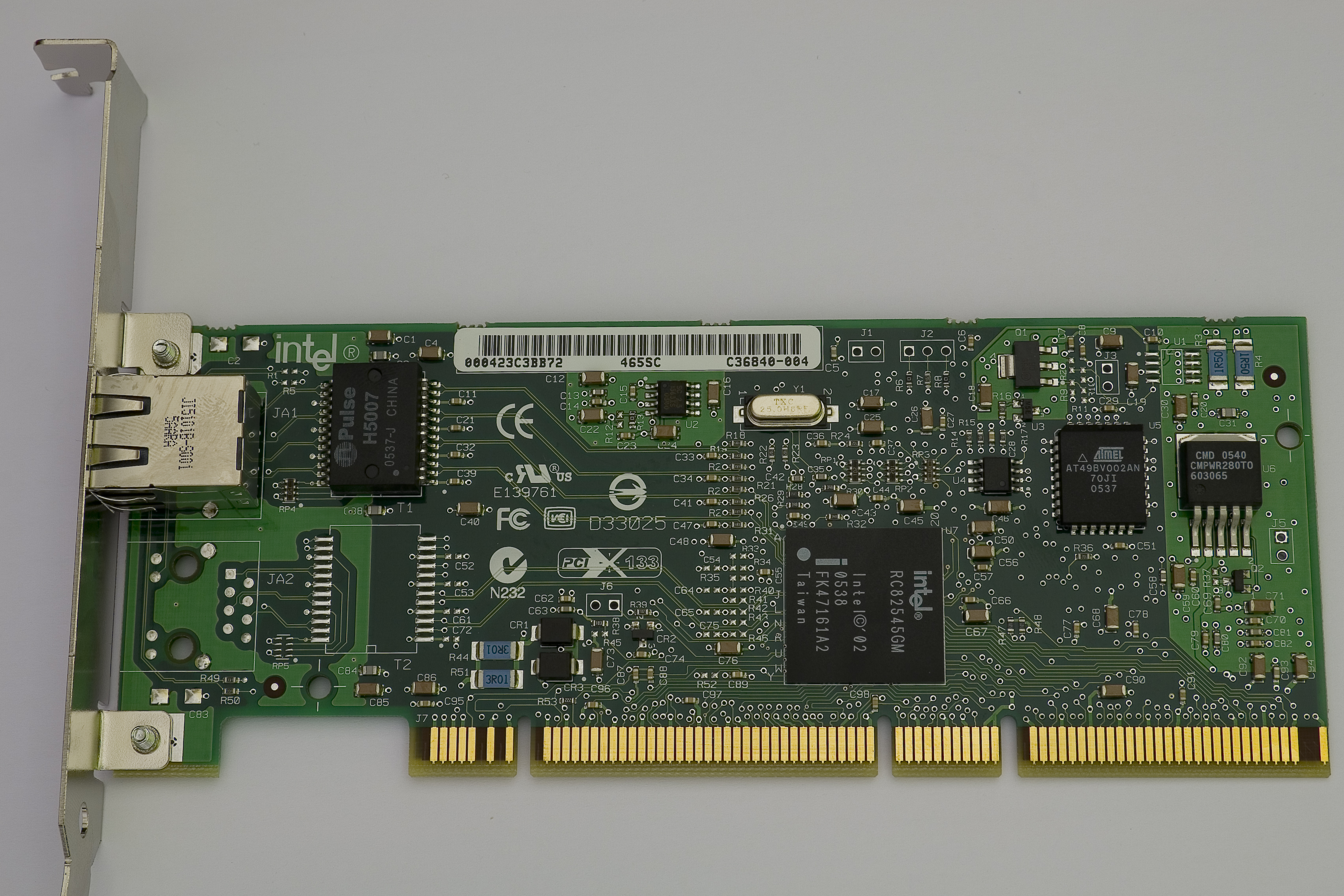
1000BASE-T–capable network interface card made by Intel, which connects to a computer via PCI-X

There are five physical layer standards for Gigabit Ethernet using optical fiber (1000BASE-X), twisted pair cable (1000BASE-T), or shielded balanced copper cable (1000BASE-CX).

The IEEE 802.3z standard includes 1000BASE-SX for transmission over multi-mode fiber, 1000BASE-LX for transmission over single-mode fiber, and the nearly obsolete 1000BASE-CX for transmission over shielded balanced copper cabling. These standards use 8b/10b encoding, which adds a 25% overhead, (Note: A 1250 Mbit/s line rate is required to achieve the 1000 Mbit/s performance) to ensure a DC balanced signal and allow for clock recovery. The symbols are then sent using NRZ line code.

Optical fiber transceivers are most often implemented as user-swappable modules in SFP form or GBIC on older devices.

IEEE 802.3ab, which defines the widely used 1000BASE-T interface type, uses a different encoding scheme in order to keep the symbol rate as low as possible, allowing transmission over twisted pair.

IEEE 802.3ap defines Ethernet operation over electrical backplanes at different speeds.

Ethernet in the first mile later added 1000BASE-LX10 and -BX10 extended-distance fiber-optic variants.

== Copper ==
Comparison of twisted-pair-based Ethernet physical transport layers (TP-PHYs)
| Name | Standard | Status | Speed (Mbit/s) | Pairs required | Lanes per direction | Bits per hertz | Line code | Symbol rate per lane (MBd) | Bandwidth (MHz) | Max distance (m) | Cable (minimum required) | Cable rating (MHz) | Usage |
|---|---|---|---|---|---|---|---|---|---|---|---|---|---|
| 1000BASE‑T | 802.3ab-1999 (CL40) | current | 1000 | 4 | 4 | 4 | TCM 4D-PAM-5 | 125 | 62.5 | 100 | Cat 5 | 100 | LAN |
| 1000BASE-T1 | 802.3bp-2016 | current | 1000 | 1 | 1 | 2.66̅ | PAM-3 80B/81B RS-FEC | 750 | 375 | 40 | Cat 6A | 500 | Automotive, IoT, M2M |
| 1000BASE‑TX | TIA/EIA-854 (2001) | obsolete | 1000 | 4 | 2 | 4 | PAM-5 | 250 | 125 | 100 | Cat 6 | 250 | Market failure |
| 1000BASE‑CX | 802.3z-1998 (CL39) | legacy | 1000 | | | | | | | | | | Data centers; predates 1000BASE-T; rarely used. |
| 1000BASE‑KX | 802.3ap-2007 (CL70) | current | 1000 | | | | | | | | | | PCBs |

=== 1000BASE-CX ===
802.3z-1998 CL39 standardized 1000BASE-CX is an initial standard for Gigabit Ethernet connections with maximum distances of 25 meters using balanced shielded twisted pair and either DE-9 or 8P8C connector (with a pinout different from 1000BASE-T). The short segment length is due to a very high signal transmission rate. Although it was used for specific applications where cabling was done by IT professionals, for instance, the IBM BladeCenter uses 1000BASE-CX for the Ethernet connections between the blade servers and the switch modules, 1000BASE-T has succeeded it for general copper wiring use.

=== 1000BASE-T ===
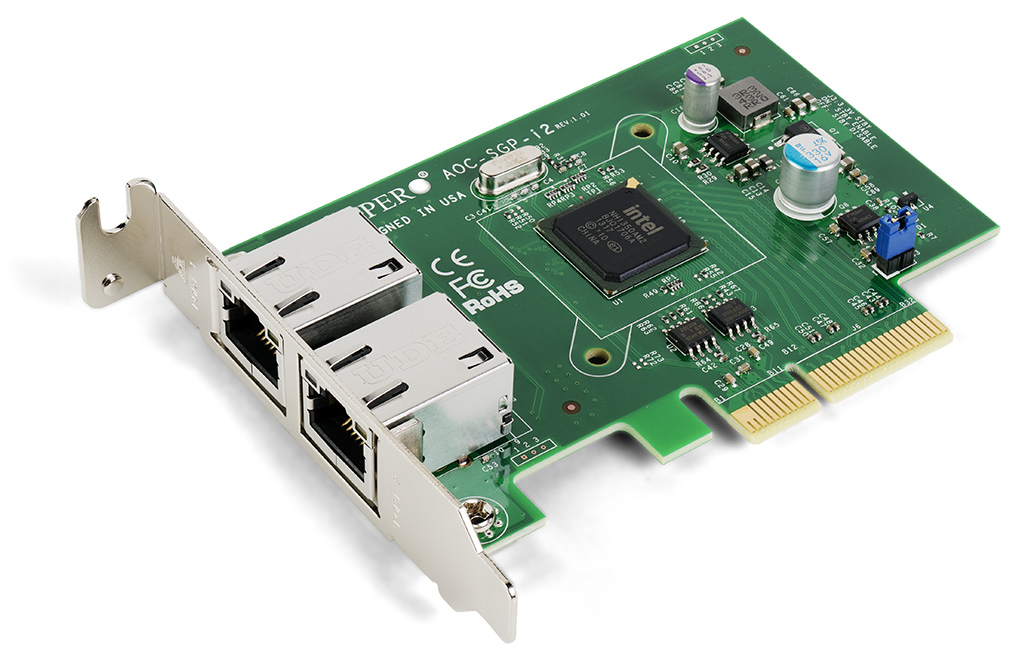
Supermicro AOC-SGP-I2 dual-port Gigabit Ethernet NIC, a PCI Express × 4 card

IEEE 802.3ab is the original standard for Gigabit Ethernet over twisted-pair wiring, known as 1000BASE-T.

Each 1000BASE-T network segment is recommended to be a maximum length of 100 meters (330 feet), (Note: In ISO the length is purely informative. The length is not a pass/fail criterion as testing the conformance to EN 50173 series standards.) and must use Category 5 cable or better.

Autonegotiation is a requirement for 1000BASE-T implementations as minimally the clock source for the link has to be negotiated, as one endpoint must be master and the other endpoint must be slave.

In a departure from both 10BASE-T and 100BASE-TX, which use a cable pair in each direction, 1000BASE-T uses four cable pairs for simultaneous transmission in both directions through the use of echo cancellation with adaptive equalization, the resulting circuits being called hybrid circuits as used in telephone hybrids. Line coding is five-level pulse-amplitude modulation (PAM-5). The symbol rate is identical to that of 100BASE-TX (125 megabaud) and the noise immunity of the five-level signaling is also identical to that of the three-level signaling in 100BASE-TX, since 1000BASE-T uses four-dimensional trellis coded modulation (TCM) to achieve a 6 dB coding gain across the four pairs.

Since autonegotiation takes place on only two pairs, if two 1000BASE-T interfaces are connected through a cable with only two pairs, the interfaces will complete negotiation and choose gigabit as the best common operating mode, but the link will never come up because, in most cases, (Note: Some implementations offer an Ethernet@Wirespeed option where a two-pair connection leads to a slower yet functional link.) all four pairs are required for data communications. Most 1000BASE-T implementations have a specific register to diagnose this behavior.

The data is transmitted over four pairs, eight bits at a time. First, eight bits of data are expanded into four three-bit symbols through a scrambling procedure based on a linear-feedback shift register; this is similar to what is done in 100BASE-T2, but uses different parameters. The three-bit symbols are then mapped to voltage levels that vary continuously during transmission. An example mapping is as follows:

| Symbol | 000 | 001 | 010 | 011 | 100 | 101 | 110 | 111 |
| Line signal level | 0 | +1 | +2 | −1 | 0 | +1 | −2 | −1 |

Automatic MDI/MDI-X configuration is specified as an optional feature in the 1000BASE-T standard, and is commonly implemented meaning that straight-through cables will often work between two GbE-capable network node interfaces (both MDI) and between two switch or hub interfaces (both MDI-X). This feature eliminates the need for Ethernet crossover cables, making obsolete the uplink vs. normal port choices and manual selector switches found on many older hubs and switches and reducing wiring errors.

In order to extend and maximize the use of existing Cat-5e and Cat-6 cabling, the newer standards 2.5GBASE-T and 5GBASE-T operate at 2.5 and 5.0 Gbit/s, respectively, on existing copper infrastructure designed for use with 1000BASE-T. They are based on 10GBASE-T but use lower signaling frequencies.

=== 1000BASE-TX ===
In 2001, the Telecommunications Industry Association (TIA) created and promoted a standard similar to 1000BASE-T that was simpler to implement, calling it 1000BASE-TX (TIA/EIA-854). The simplified design would have, in theory, reduced the cost of the required electronics by only using four unidirectional pairs (two pairs TX and two pairs RX) instead of four bidirectional pairs.

=== 1000BASE-KX ===
802.3ap-2007 CL70 standardized 1000BASE-KX as part of the IEEE 802.3ap standard for Ethernet Operation over Electrical Backplanes. This standard defines one to four lanes of backplane links, one RX and one TX differential pair per lane, at link bandwidth ranging from 100 Mbit/s to 10 Gbit/s (from 100BASE-KX to 10GBASE-KX4). The 1000BASE-KX variant uses a 1.25 GBd electrical signaling speed.

=== 1000BASE-T1 ===
IEEE 802.3 standardized 1000BASE-T1 in IEEE Std 802.3bp-2016. It defines Gigabit Ethernet over a single twisted pair for automotive and industrial applications. It includes cable specifications for 15 meters (type A) or 40 meters (type B) reach. The transmission is done using PAM-3 at 750 MBd.

== Fiber optics ==
1000BASE-X is used in industry to refer to Gigabit Ethernet transmission over fiber, where options include 1000BASE-SX, 1000BASE-LX, 1000BASE-LX10, 1000BASE-BX10 or the non-standard -EX and -ZX implementations. Included are copper variants, 1000BASE‑CX and 1000BASE‑KX, which use the same 8b/10b line code as the fiber variants. 1000BASE-X is based on the physical-layer standards developed for Fibre Channel.

Legend for fibre-based PHYs
| Fibre type | Introduced | Performance |
|---|---|---|
| MMF FDDI 62.5/125 µm | 1987 | 160 MHz·km @ 850 nm |
| MMF OM1 62.5/125 µm | 1989 | 200 MHz·km @ 850 nm |
| MMF OM2 50/125 µm | 1998 | 500 MHz·km @ 850 nm |
| MMF OM3 50/125 µm | 2003 | 1500 MHz·km @ 850 nm |
| MMF OM4 50/125 µm | 2008 | 3500 MHz·km @ 850 nm |
| MMF OM5 50/125 µm | 2016 | 3500 MHz·km @ 850 nm and 1850 MHz·km @ 950 nm |
| SMF OS1 9/125 µm | 1998 | 1.0 dB/km @ 1300/1550 nm |
| SMF OS2 9/125 µm | 2000 | 0.4 dB/km @ 1300/1550 nm |

1000BASE-X Gigabit Ethernet variants
| Name | Standard | Status | Media | Connector | Transceiver module | Reach (m) | # Media (⇆) | # Lambdas (→) | # Lanes (→) | Notes |
|---|---|---|---|---|---|---|---|---|---|---|
| 1000BASE‑CX | 802.3z-1998 (CL39) | Legacy | TWP shielded balanced (150 Ω) | 8P8C, DE-9, HSSDC (IEC 61076-3-103), CX4 (SFF-8470) | —N/a | 25 | 4 | N/A | 4 | Data centers; predates 1000BASE-T; rarely used. |
| 1000BASE‑KX | 802.3ap-2007 (CL70) | Current | Cu-Backplane | —N/a | —N/a | 1 | 1 | N/A | 4 | Printed circuit boards |
| 1000BASE‑SX | 802.3z-1998 (CL38) | Current | Fibre; 770 – 860 nm | ST; SC; LC; MT-RJ | SFP; ~~GBIC~~ direct-plug | OM1: 275 | 2 | 1 | 1 | Popular in intra-building LANs |
| 1000BASE‑SX | 802.3z-1998 (CL38) | Current | Fibre; 770 – 860 nm | ST; SC; LC; MT-RJ | SFP; ~~GBIC~~ direct-plug | OM2: 550 | 2 | 1 | 1 | Popular in intra-building LANs |
| 1000BASE‑SX | 802.3z-1998 (CL38) | Current | Fibre; 770 – 860 nm | ST; SC; LC; MT-RJ | SFP; ~~GBIC~~ direct-plug | OM3: 1k | 2 | 1 | 1 | Popular in intra-building LANs |
| 1000BASE‑LSX | Proprietary (non IEEE) | Current | Fibre; 1310 nm | LC | SFP | OM1: 2k | 2 | 1 | 1 | Vendor-specific; FP laser transmitter |
| 1000BASE‑LSX | Proprietary (non IEEE) | Current | Fibre; 1310 nm | LC | SFP | OM2: 1k | 2 | 1 | 1 | Vendor-specific; FP laser transmitter |
| 1000BASE‑LSX | Proprietary (non IEEE) | Current | Fibre; 1310 nm | LC | SFP | OM4: 2k | 2 | 1 | 1 | Vendor-specific; FP laser transmitter |
| 1000BASE‑LX | 802.3z-1998 (CL38) | Current | Fibre; 1270 – 1355 nm | SC; LC | SFP; GBIC direct-plug | OM1: 550 | 2 | 1 | 1 | |
| 1000BASE‑LX | 802.3z-1998 (CL38) | Current | Fibre; 1270 – 1355 nm | SC; LC | SFP; GBIC direct-plug | OM2: 550 | 2 | 1 | 1 | |
| 1000BASE‑LX | 802.3z-1998 (CL38) | Current | Fibre; 1270 – 1355 nm | SC; LC | SFP; GBIC direct-plug | OM3: 550 | 2 | 1 | 1 | |
| 1000BASE‑LX | 802.3z-1998 (CL38) | Current | Fibre; 1270 – 1355 nm | SC; LC | SFP; GBIC direct-plug | OSx: 5k | 2 | 1 | 1 | |
| 1000BASE‑LX10 | 802.3ah-2004 (CL59) | Current | Fibre; 1260 – 1360 nm | LC | SFP | OM1: 550 | 2 | 1 | 1 | Identical with -LX but with increased power/sensitivity; commonly simply referred to as -LX or -LH prior to 802.3ah |
| 1000BASE‑LX10 | 802.3ah-2004 (CL59) | Current | Fibre; 1260 – 1360 nm | LC | SFP | OM2: 550 | 2 | 1 | 1 | Identical with -LX but with increased power/sensitivity; commonly simply referred to as -LX or -LH prior to 802.3ah |
| 1000BASE‑LX10 | 802.3ah-2004 (CL59) | Current | Fibre; 1260 – 1360 nm | LC | SFP | OM3: 550 | 2 | 1 | 1 | Identical with -LX but with increased power/sensitivity; commonly simply referred to as -LX or -LH prior to 802.3ah |
| 1000BASE‑LX10 | 802.3ah-2004 (CL59) | Current | Fibre; 1260 – 1360 nm | LC | SFP | OSx: 10k | 2 | 1 | 1 | Identical with -LX but with increased power/sensitivity; commonly simply referred to as -LX or -LH prior to 802.3ah |
| 1000BASE-BX10 | 802.3ah-2004 (CL59) | Current | Fibre; TX: 1260 – 1360 nm RX: 1480 – 1500 nm | LC | SFP | OSx: 10k | 1 | 1 | 1 | Often simply referred to as -BX and BiDi |
| 1000BASE‑EX | Proprietary (non IEEE) | Current | Fibre; 1310 nm | SC; LC | SFP; GBIC | OSx: 40k | 2 | 1 | 1 | Vendor specific |
| 1000BASE‑ZX, ‑EZX | Proprietary (non IEEE) | Current | Fibre; 1550 nm | SC; LC | SFP; GBIC | OSx: 70k | 2 | 1 | 1 | Vendor specific |
| 1000BASE‑RHx | 802.3bv-2017 (CL115) | Current | Fibre; 650 nm | FOT (PMD/MDI) | —N/a | POF: ≤ 50 | 1 | 1 | 1 | Automotive, industrial, Home; Line code: 64b65b × PAM16; Line rate: 325 MBd; Variants: -RHA (50 m), -RHB (40 m), -RHC (15 m). |
| 1000BASE-PX | 802.3ah-2004 802.3bk-2013 (CL60) | Current | Fibre; TX: 1270 nm RX: 1577 nm | SC | SFP; XFP | OSx: 10k – 40k | 1 | 1 | 1 | EPON; FTTH; using point-to-multipoint topology. |
| 1000BASE‑CWDM | ITU-T G.694.2 | Current | Fibre; 1270 – 1610 nm | LC | SFP | OSx: 40k – 100k | 2 | 1 | 1 | CWDM makes it possible to have multiple parallel channels over 2 fibers; spectral bandwidth 11 nm; capable of 18 parallel channels |
| 1000BASE‑DWDM | ITU-T G.694.1 | Current | Fibre; 1528 – 1565 nm | LC | SFP | OSx: 40k – 120k | 2 | 1 | 1 | DWDM makes it possible to have multiple parallel channels over 2 fibers; spectral bandwidth 0.2 nm; capable of 45 to 160 parallel channels |

=== 1000BASE-SX ===
1000BASE-SX is an optical fiber Gigabit Ethernet standard for operation over multi-mode fiber using a 770 to 860 nanometer, near infrared (NIR) wavelength.

The standard specifies a maximum length of 220 meters for 62.5 μm/160 MHz·km multi-mode fiber, 275 m for 62.5 μm/200 MHz·km, 500 m for 50 μm/400 MHz·km, and 550 m for 50 μm/500 MHz·km multi-mode fiber. Fiber optic cable manufacturers have extended the reach of 1000BASE-SX to at least 1 km when used with more modern fiber optic grades such as OM3 and OM4. The SX interface is specified to have a minimum output power of −9.5 dBm and minimum receive sensitivity of −17 dBm.

This standard is popular for commercial intra-building links, co-location facilities and carrier-neutral Internet exchange points.

=== 1000BASE-LSX ===
1000BASE-LSX is a non-standard but industry-accepted term to refer to an improved 1000BASE-SX capable of distances up to 2 km. It achieves longer distances over a pair of multi-mode fibers with the use of Fabry Perot laser transmitter and runs in the 1310 nm band.

=== 1000BASE-LX ===
1000BASE-LX is an optical fiber Gigabit Ethernet standard specified in IEEE 802.3 Clause 38 which uses a long wavelength laser (1,270–1,355 nm), and a maximum RMS spectral width of 4 nm. 1000BASE-LX is specified to work over a distance of up to 5 km over 10 μm single-mode fiber.

1000BASE-LX can also run over all common types of multi-mode fiber with a maximum segment length of 550 m. For link distances greater than 300 m, the use of a special launch conditioning patch cord may be required. This launches the laser at a precise offset from the center of the fiber which causes it to spread across the diameter of the fiber core, reducing the effect known as differential mode delay which occurs when the laser couples onto only a small number of available modes in multi-mode fiber.

=== 1000BASE-LX10 ===
1000BASE-LX10 was standardized six years after the initial gigabit fiber versions as part of the Ethernet in the first mile task group. It is practically identical to 1000BASE-LX, but achieves longer distances up to 10 km over a pair of single-mode fiber due to higher quality optics. Before it was standardized, 1000BASE-LX10 was essentially already in widespread use by many vendors as a proprietary extension called either 1000BASE-LX/LH or 1000BASE-LH.

=== 1000BASE-EX ===
1000BASE-EX is a non-standard but industry accepted term to refer to Gigabit Ethernet transmission. It is very similar to 1000BASE-LX10 but achieves longer distances up to 40 km over a pair of single-mode fibers due to higher quality optics than a LX10, running on 1310 nm wavelength lasers. It is sometimes referred to as LH (Long Haul), and is easily confused with 1000BASE-LX10 or 1000BASE-ZX because the use of -LX(10), -LH, -EX, and -ZX is ambiguous between vendors. 1000BASE-ZX is a very similar non-standard longer-reach variant that uses 1550 nm wavelength optics.

=== 1000BASE-BX10 ===
1000BASE-BX10 is capable of up to 10 km over a single strand of single-mode fiber, with a different wavelength going in each direction. The terminals on each side of the fiber are not equal, as the one transmitting downstream (from the center of the network to the outside) uses the 1490 nm wavelength, and the one transmitting upstream uses the 1310 nm wavelength. This is accomplished using a passive splitter prism inside each transceiver.

Other, non-standard higher-powered single-strand optics commonly known as "BiDi" (bi-directional) utilize wavelength pairs in the 1490/1550 nm range, and are capable of reaching distances of 20, 40 and 80 km, or greater depending on module cost, fiber path loss, splices, connectors and patch panels. Very long reach BiDi optics may use 1510/1590 nm wavelength pairs.

=== 1000BASE-ZX ===
1000BASE-ZX is a non-standard but multi-vendor term to refer to Gigabit Ethernet transmission using 1,550 nm wavelength to achieve distances of at least 70 km (43 mi) over single-mode fiber. Some vendors specify distances up to 120 km (75 mi) over single-mode fiber, sometimes called 1000BASE-EZX. Ranges beyond 80 km are highly dependent upon the path loss of the fiber in use, specifically the attenuation figure in dB per km, the number and quality of connectors/patch panels and splices located between transceivers.

=== 1000BASE‑CWDM ===
1000BASE-CWDM is a non-standard but industry accepted term to refer to Gigabit Ethernet transmission. It is very similar to 1000BASE-LX10 but achieves longer distances up 40–120 km, and up to 18 parallel channels over a pair of single-mode fibers due to higher quality optics than LX10 and use of CWDM, running on 1270-1610 nm wavelength lasers.

Use of CWDM requires a Mux/Demux unit at both ends of the fiber link, a CWDM MUX/DEMUX with corresponding wavelengths, and SFP with corresponding wavelengths. is it also possible to DWDM in serie to increase number of channels.

Most uses Wavelengths: 1270 nm, 1290 nm, 1310 nm, 1330 nm, 1350 nm, 1370 nm, 1390 nm, 1410 nm, 1430 nm, 1450 nm, 1470 nm, 1490 nm, 1510 nm, 1530 nm, 1550 nm, 1570 nm, 1590 nm and 1610 nm

CWDM is cheaper to use than DWDM, about 1/5-1/3 of the cost. CWDM is about 5-10 times more expensive the if you have the fiber available, then traditional -LX/-LZ transceivers.

=== 1000BASE‑DWDM ===
1000BASE-DWDM is a non-standard but industry accepted term to refer to Gigabit Ethernet transmission. It is very similar to 1000BASE-LX10 but achieves longer distances up 40–120 km, and up to 64 to 160 parallel channels over a pair of single-mode fibers due to higher quality optics than LX10 and use of DWDM, running on 1528-1565 nm wavelength lasers.

The most used channels are CH17-61 on Wavelength 1528.77-1563-86 nm.

To use DWDM it is necessary to use a Mux/Demux unit on both ends of the fiber link, a DWDM MUX/DEMUX with corresponding wavelengths, and SFP with corresponding wavelengths. is it also possible to use CWDM in series to increase the number of channels.

=== 1000BASE-RHx ===
IEEE 802.3bv-2017 defines standardizes Gigabit Ethernet over step-index plastic optical fiber (POF) using -R 64b/65b large block encoding with red light (600–700 nm). 1000BASE-RHA is intended for home and consumer use (just clamping the bare POF), 1000BASE-RHB for industrial, and 1000BASE-RHC for automotive applications.

=== Optical interoperability ===
There may be optical interoperability with respective 1000BASE-X Ethernet interfaces on the same link. It is also possible with certain types of optics to have a mismatch in wavelength.

To achieve interoperability some criteria have to be met:

- Line encoding
- Wavelength (Note: It may be possible for certain types of optics to work with a mismatch in wavelength.)
- Duplex mode
- Media count
- Media type and dimension

1000BASE-X Ethernet is not backward compatible with 100BASE-X and is not forward compatible with 10GBASE-X.

== See also ==
- List of interface bit rates
- Physical coding sublayer
