= Multi-mode optical fiber =

Type of optical fiber mostly used for communication over short distances

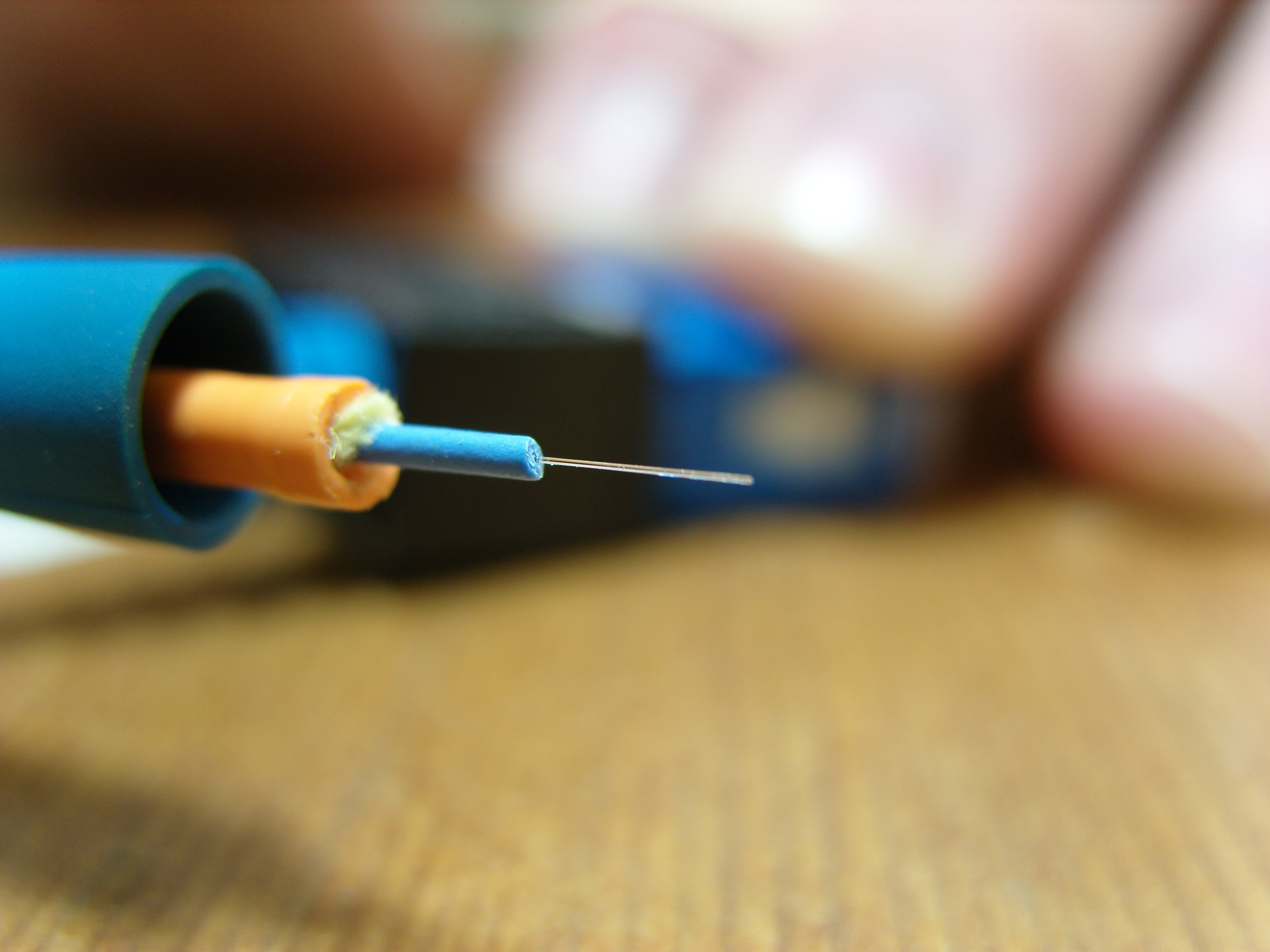
A stripped multi-mode fiber

Multi-mode optical fiber is a type of optical fiber mostly used for communication over short distances, such as within a building or on a campus. Multi-mode links can be used for data rates up to 800 Gbit/s. Multi-mode fiber has a fairly large core diameter that enables multiple light modes to be propagated and limits the maximum length of a transmission link because of modal dispersion. The standard G.651.1 defines the most widely used forms of multi-mode optical fiber.

== Applications ==
The equipment used for communications over multi-mode optical fiber is less expensive than that for single-mode optical fiber.

Because of its high capacity and reliability, multi-mode optical fiber is generally used for backbone applications in buildings. An increasing number of users are taking the benefits of fiber closer to the user by running fiber to the desktop or to the zone. Standards-compliant architectures such as Centralized Cabling and fiber to the telecom enclosure offer users the ability to leverage the distance capabilities of fiber by centralizing electronics in telecommunications rooms, rather than having active electronics on each floor.

Multi-mode fiber is used for transporting light signals to and from miniature fiber optic spectroscopy equipment (spectrometers, sources, and sampling accessories) and was instrumental in the development of the first portable spectrometer.

Multi-mode fiber is also used when high optical powers are to be carried through an optical fiber, such as in laser welding.

== Comparison with single-mode fiber ==
Energy distribution of transverse electric (TE) modes in an optical fiber. At fixed radius and refractive index, the number of modes allowed depends on the wavelength. λ/R is the ratio of the light's wavelength to the fiber's radius.

Multi-mode optical fiber features a larger core diameter (typically 50–100 μm), allowing multiple light modes to propagate simultaneously. This design simplifies alignment and installation, making MMF cost-effective and ideal for short- to medium-distance data transmission in enterprise networks, data centers, and campus environments. MMF supports high data rates—up to 100 Gbps—over distances typically ranging from 300 to 550 meters, depending on fiber type (OM3, OM4, OM5). Additionally, MMF can utilize lower-cost light sources such as light-emitting diodes (LEDs) and vertical-cavity surface-emitting lasers (VCSELs), reducing overall system cost while maintaining reliable performance.

LEDs and VCSELs operate at the 850 nm and 1300 nm wavelengths, whereas single-mode fibers used in telecommunications typically operate at 1310 or 1550 nm. However, compared to single-mode fibers, the multi-mode fiber bandwidth–distance product limit is lower. Because multi-mode fiber has a larger core size than single-mode fiber, it supports more than one propagation mode; hence, it is limited by modal dispersion, while single mode is not.

The LED light sources sometimes used with multi-mode fiber produce a range of wavelengths and these each propagate at different speeds. This chromatic dispersion is another limit to the useful length for multi-mode fiber optic cable. In contrast, the lasers used to drive single-mode fibers produce coherent light of a single wavelength. Because of modal dispersion, multi-mode fiber has higher pulse spreading rates than single-mode fiber, limiting multi-mode fiber's information transmission capacity.

Single-mode fibers are often used in high-precision scientific research because restricting the light to only one propagation mode allows it to be focused to an intense, diffraction-limited spot.

Jacket color is sometimes used to distinguish multi-mode cables from single-mode ones. The standard TIA-598C recommends, for non-military applications, the use of a yellow jacket for single-mode fiber, and orange or aqua for multi-mode fiber, depending on type. Some vendors use violet to distinguish higher performance OM4 communications fiber from other types.

== Types ==
Multi-mode fibers are described by their core and cladding diameters. Thus, 62.5/125 μm multi-mode fiber has a core size of 62.5 micrometres (μm) and a cladding diameter of 125 μm. The transition between the core and cladding can be sharp, which is called a step-index profile, or a gradual transition, which is called a graded-index profile. The two types have different dispersion characteristics and thus different effective propagation distances. Multi-mode fibers may be constructed with either graded or step-index profile.

In addition, multi-mode fibers are described using a system of classification determined by the ISO 11801 standard — OM1, OM2, and OM3 — which is based on the modal bandwidth of the multi-mode fiber. OM4 (defined in TIA-492-AAAD) was finalized in August 2009, and was published by the end of 2009 by the TIA. OM4 cable supports 125 m links at 40 and 100 Gbit/s. The letters OM stand for 'optical multi-mode'.

For many years, 62.5/125 μm (OM1) and conventional 50/125 μm multi-mode fiber (OM2) were widely deployed in premises applications. These fibers easily support applications ranging from Ethernet (10 Mbit/s) to gigabit Ethernet (1 Gbit/s) and, because of their relatively large core size, were ideal for use with LED transmitters. Newer deployments often use laser-optimized 50/125 μm multi-mode fiber (OM3). Fibers that meet this designation provide sufficient bandwidth to support 10 Gigabit Ethernet up to 300 meters. Optical fiber manufacturers have greatly refined their manufacturing process since that standard was issued and cables can be made that support 10 GbE up to 400 meters. Laser-optimized multi-mode fiber (LOMMF) is designed for use with 850 nm VCSELs.

Older FDDI-grade, OM1 and OM2 fiber can be used for 10 Gigabit Ethernet through 10GBASE-LRM. This requires the SFP+ interface to support electronic dispersion compensation (EDC) and not all switches, routers and other equipment support these SFP+ modules.

The migration to LOMMF/OM3 has occurred as users upgrade to higher-speed networks. LEDs have a maximum modulation rate of 622 Mbit/s because they cannot be turned on/off fast enough to support higher bandwidth applications. VCSELs are capable of modulation over 10 Gbit/s and are used in many high-speed networks.

Some 200 and 400 Gigabit Ethernet speeds (e.g. 400GBASE-SR4.2) use wavelength-division multiplexing (WDM) even for multi-mode fiber, which is outside the specification for OM4 and lower. In 2017, OM5 was standardized by TIA and ISO for WDM MMF, specifying not only a minimum modal bandwidth for 850 nm but a curve spanning from 850 to 953 nm.

Cables can sometimes be distinguished by jacket color: for 62.5/125 μm (OM1) and 50/125 μm (OM2), orange jackets are recommended, while aqua is recommended for 50/125 μm "laser optimized" OM3 and OM4 fiber. Some fiber vendors use violet for "OM4+". OM5 is officially colored lime green.

VCSEL power profiles, along with variations in fiber uniformity, can cause modal dispersion, which is measured by differential modal delay (DMD). Modal dispersion is caused by the different speeds of the individual modes in a light pulse. The net effect causes the light pulse to spread over distance, introducing intersymbol interference. The greater the length, the greater the modal dispersion. To combat modal dispersion, LOMMF is manufactured in a way that eliminates variations in the fiber, which could affect the speed at which a light pulse can travel. The refractive index profile is enhanced for VCSEL transmission and to prevent pulse spreading. As a result, the fibers maintain signal integrity over longer distances, thereby maximizing the bandwidth.

=== Comparison ===
Minimum reach (Note: Reach means maximum length. The minimum reach is the length that is guaranteed to work when within specifications.) of Ethernet variants over multi-mode fiber
Jacket color and category	Minimum modal bandwidth 850 / 953 / 1300 nm (Note: OFL Over-Filled Launch for 850/953 nm / EMB Effective Modal Bandwidth for 1310 nm)	Fast Ethernet 100BASE-FX	1 Gb (1000 Mb) Ethernet 1000BASE-SX	1 Gb (1000 Mb) Ethernet 1000BASE-LX	10 Gb Ethernet 10GBASE-SR	10 Gb Ethernet 10GBASE-LRM (requires EDC)	25 Gb Ethernet 25GBASE-SR	40 Gb Ethernet 40GBASE-SWDM4	40 Gb Ethernet 40GBASE-SR4	100 Gb Ethernet 100GBASE-SR10
FDDI (62.5/125)	160 / – / 500 MHz·km	2000 m	220 m	550 m (mode-conditioning patch cord required)	26 m	220 m	No	No	No	No
OM1 (62.5/125)	200 / – / 500 MHz·km	2000 m	275 m	550 m (mode-conditioning patch cord required)	33 m	220 m	No	No	No	No
OM2 (50/125)	500 / – / 500 MHz·km	2000 m	550 m	550 m (mode-conditioning patch cord required)	82 m	220 m	No	No	No	No
OM3 (50/125) *Laser Optimized*	1500 / – / 500 MHz·km	2000 m	550 m	550 m (No mode-conditioning patch cord should be used.)	300 m	220 m	70 m	240m Duplex LC	100 m (330 m QSFP+ eSR4)	100 m
OM4 (50/125) *Laser Optimized*	3500 / – / 500 MHz·km	2000 m	550 m	550 m (No mode-conditioning patch cord should be used.)	400 m	>220 m	100 m	350m Duplex LC	150 m (550 m QSFP+ eSR4)	150 m
OM5 (50/125) "Wideband multi-mode" for short-wave WDM	3500 / 1850 / 500 MHz·km	2000 m	550 m	550 m (No mode-conditioning patch cord should be used.)	400 m	>220 m	100 m	350m Duplex LC	150 m (550 m QSFP+ eSR4)	150 m

== Encircled flux ==
The IEC 61280-4-1 (now TIA-526-14-B) standard defines encircled flux which specifies test light injection sizes (for various fiber diameters) to make sure the fiber core is not over-filled or under-filled to allow more reproducible (and less variable) link-loss measurements.

== See also ==
- Fiber-optic communication
- Graded-index fiber
- ISO/IEC 11801
- IEEE 802.3
- Optical fiber connector
