= Normalized frequency (fiber optics) =

Property of an optical fiber

In an optical fiber, the normalized frequency, V (also called the V number), is given by
$$V = {2 \pi a \over \lambda} \sqrt{{n_1}^2 - {n_2}^2} = {2 \pi a \over \lambda} \times NA,$$
where a is the core radius, λ is the wavelength in vacuum, n_{1} is the maximum refractive index of the core, n_{2} is the refractive index of the homogeneous cladding, and applying the usual definition of the numerical aperture NA.

In multimode operation of an optical fiber having a power-law refractive index profile, the approximate number of bound modes (the mode volume), is given by
$${V^2 \over 2} \left( {g \over g + 2} \right)\ ,$$
where g is the profile parameter, and V is the normalized frequency, which must be greater than 5 for the approximation to be valid.

For a step-index fiber, the mode volume is given by V^{2}/2. For single-mode operation, it is required that V < 2.4048, the first root of the Bessel function J_{0}.

== See also ==
- Abbe number
