= Reflectin =

Protein in cephalopods

Leucophore layer composition

Reflectins are a family of intrinsically disordered proteins evolved by a certain number of cephalopods including Euprymna scolopes and Doryteuthis opalescens to produce iridescent camouflage and signaling. The recently identified protein family is enriched in aromatic and sulfur-containing amino acids, and is utilized by certain cephalopods to refract incident light in their environment. The reflectin protein is responsible for dynamic pigmentation and iridescence in organisms. This process is "dynamic" due to its reversible properties, allowing reflectin to change an organism's appearance in response to external factors such as needing to camouflage or send warning signals.

Reflectin proteins are likely distributed in the outer layer of cells called "sheath cells" that surround an organism's pigment cells also known as chromatocyte. Specific sequences of reflectin enable cephalopods to communicate and camouflage by adjusting color and reflectivity.

== Origin ==
Reflectin is presumed to have originated from a type of transposon (nicknamed jumping genes), which is a DNA sequence that can change positions within genetic material by encoding an enzyme. The encoded enzyme detaches transposon from one location in a genome and ligates (binds) it to another. "Jumps" of transposon can create or reverse mutations that alter a cell's genetic identity which can result in new characteristics. This process can be thought of as a "cut and paste" mechanism. Transposons' ability to adapt in a genome and quickly shift its identity is a property that closely resembles the behavior of reflectin.

An additional ancestor could be symbiotic Vibrio fischeri (also called Aliivibrio fischeri) which is a bioluminescent (produces and emits light) bacterium often found in symbiotic relationships. As reflectin and Vibrio fischeri share similar functions such as producing an iridescent appearance in organisms, it is also thought that, just like Vibrio fischeri, Reflectin is symbiotic and is used by cephalopods to interact with their environment.

== Structure ==
Reflectin is a disordered protein made up of conserved amino acid sequences. Each sequence includes a combination of standard and sulphur-containing amino acids. Although the basic structure can be deduced, the exact molecular structure is yet to be determined. Light interacting properties of reflectin can be attributed to its ordered hierarchical structure and hydrogen bonding.

== Reflectin in membranes ==
Reflectin make up the majority of Bragg reflectors which are formed by invaginations of the cell membrane. Bragg reflectors are responsible for reflecting color in a type of skin cell called iridocyte. Reflectors are composed of periodically stacked lamellae which are thin layers of tissue bound to a membrane. The color and brightness of light reflected by many species is determined by the thickness, spacing, and refractive index (how fast light can travel through the membrane) of the Bragg lamellae. A change in membrane thickness triggers an outflow of water from the Bragg lamellae, essentially dehydrating it, increasing their refractive index and decreasing thickness and spacing. This results in an increase in reflectance from the Bragg lamellae, and a change in color of the reflected light. This change additionally allows initially transparent cells to increase in brightness

== Mechanisms ==
Reflectin is able to receive information from signals for a continuous process to fine-tune the osmotic pressure of sub-cellular structures of cephlapods. This ongoing process is used to regulate photonic behavior, or in other words, control how an organism changes color. The components of reflectin carry a very strong positive charge. Nerve signals are sent to iridophore cells (also called chromatophores) which are pigment-containing cells that add a negative charge to reflectin. With the charges balanced, the protein folds up to expose a sticky surface, causing reflecting molecules to clump together. This process repeats until enough reflectin proteins have accumulated to change the fluid pressure of the membrane of the cell walls. The thickness of the membrane reduces as water escapes, a process that changes the wavelength of light reflected. By adapting an organism's membrane to reflect different wavelengths, reflection allows cephlapods to shift from different colors of red, yellow, green, and blue as well as adjust the brightness of the projected color.

== Current Research ==
- Research teams of ICB (Institute for Collaborative Biotechnologies) discovered that reflectin assembly can be electrically fine-tuned, suggesting a new approach of controlling protein machines similar to reflectin Biotic-abiotic manipulating by electrically fine-tuning reflectin assembly
- Researchers at the University of California, Santa Barbara (UCSB) may have implications for molecular engineering based on the mechanisms similar to transformations controlled by reflectin. Discoveries about reflectin may even point the way towards treatments for Alzheimer's disease. Processes used by reflectin are similar to those seen when proteins assemble in the brain during the progress of protein-related diseases like Alzheimer's and Parkinson's. Understanding how brain-damaging pathology might be reversed.
- Researchers think that reversible mechanisms used by reflectin protein may be replicated to develop dynamic living human cells and tissues. These findings could be applied to the development of biophotonic tools used in material science and bioengineering Optical engineering of human cells
- Based on reflectin's function to camouflage cephalopods, researchers believe it is possible to create a material used for the growth of human neural and progenitor cells. Using reflectin as a material for neural stem cell growth

== Use in bioengineering ==
Engineered human cells with tunable optical properties

Reflectin structures produced by engineered mammalian cells

Reflectins have been heterologously expressed in mammalian cells to change their refractive index.
