= Refractive index profile =

Distribution of refractive indices of materials within an optical fiber

A refractive index profile is the distribution of refractive indices of materials within an optical fiber. Some optical fiber has a step-index profile, in which the core has one uniformly-distributed index and the cladding has a lower uniformly-distributed index. Other optical fiber has a graded-index profile, in which the refractive index varies gradually as a function of radial distance from the fiber center. Graded-index profiles include power-law index profiles and parabolic index profiles.
