= PKS 0226−559 =

Quasar in the constellation Horologium

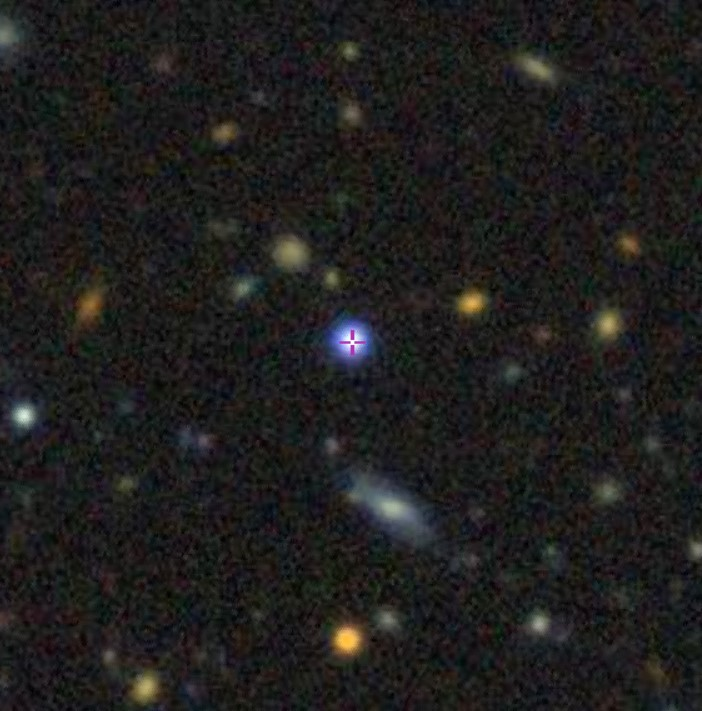
- PKS 0226−559, as seen by DESI Legacy Surveys

Observation data (J2000.0 epoch)
- Constellation: Horologium
- Right ascension: 02^{h} 28^{m} 21.61^{s}
- Declination: −55° 46′ 03.50″
- Redshift: 2.464000
- Heliocentric radial velocity: 738,689 km/s
- Distance: 10.659 Gly (light travel time distance)
- Apparent magnitude (V): 0.087
- Apparent magnitude (B): 0.115
- Surface brightness: 17.6

Characteristics
- Type: FSRQ

Other designations
- PKS B0226−559, PMN J0228−5546, ACT-S J022821−554601, RFC J0228−5546, BZQ J0228−5546, IRCF J022821.5−554603, CRATES J0228−5546

PKS 0226−559 known as PMN J0228−5546 is a quasar located in the constellation Horologium. At the redshift of 2.464, the object is roughly 10.6 billion light-years from Earth.

== Characteristics ==
PKS 0226−559 contains a flat-spectrum radio source found brighter than S4.8 GHz=65 mJy. It is classified as a blazar, a type of powerful extragalactic object shooting out an astrophysical jet towards Earth's direction with a jet axis of ≲20° with strong variability across electro-magnetic spectrum. Such blazars like PKS 0226−559 have a rapid broad-band flux density and polarisation variability, with fast superluminal motion, and a high degree of polarisation. There are two classifications based on the presence of emission lines. The first classification are BL Lacertae objects with weak or emission lines absent. The second classification are flat-spectrum radio quasars (FSRQs) with strong emission lines, whom PKS 0226−559 belongs to.

The quasar is known to have a non-thermal emission in which from the jets, accessible bands of the electromagnetic spectrum can be seen, right up to high energy (HE; >100 MeV) and very high energy reaching up to (VHE; >100 MeV) in γ-ray bands. The broad-band spectral energy distribution (SED) in PKS 0226−559 shows two broad humps features, in which the synchrotron peak frequency (ν S peak) in PKS 0226−559 is positioned between 1012.5 and 1014.5 Hz.

According to observations conducted from the Large Area Telescope, one of the instruments has found that PKS 0226−559 shows an increasing gamma-ray emission from a source. It is believed that the accretion of matter is responsible for powering emission into the supermassive black hole in PKS 0226−559.

PKS 0226−559 has a power-law index of p = 1.56 ± 0.064; this signifies a flux variation, which in the 0.3–10 keV band, the weakest sources tend to exhibit fluxes on the order of (1.06 ± 0.32) × 10^{−13} erg cm^{−2}s^{−1}, while the brighter source reaches up to (2.96 ± 0.02) × 10−11 erg cm−2s−1, while majority of the sources exhibits a soft photon index.

The bolometric luminosity of PKS 0226−559 is found to exceed 10^{48} erg s^{−1} with γ-ray flux ranging between 4.84 × 10^{−10} to 1.50 × 10^{−7} photon cm-2 s-1. This allows it to be observed even located at very high redshift. Distant blazars like PKS 0226−559, are particularly interesting, as since the study offers insights how supermassive black holes form and evolve over time, as well as proving insight to relativistic jets, and the connections between accretion discs and jets. Moreover, their γ-ray emission is important for probing the early universe given γ-ray emission from distant blazars undergoes attenuation via γγ absorption when they interact with extragalactic background light (EBL) photons, that enables observations constraining the EBL's density.
