= G.651.1 =

ITU-T Recommendation

- Characteristics of a 50/125 µm multimode graded index optical fibre cable for the optical access network
- Status: In force
- Year started: 2007
- Latest version: 2.0; November 2018
- Organization: ITU-T
- Committee: ITU-T Study Group 15
- Related standards: G.652, G.657, G.8201
- Domain: telecommunication
- License: Freely available
- Website: https://www.itu.int/rec/T-REC-G.651.1

G.651.1 is an international standard developed by the Standardization Sector of the International Telecommunication Union (ITU-T) that specifies multi-mode optical fiber (MMF) cable.

== History ==
The G.651.1 Recommendation builds on a previous fiber optic specification in G.651.

G.651.1 was first published in 2007. Revisions of the standard were since published in 2008, and 2018 (November).
