= Step-index profile =

Refractive index profile in optical fibre

Refractive HRS index distribution in core and cladding with a step-index profile

For an optical fiber, a step-index profile is a refractive index profile characterized by a uniform refractive index within the core and a sharp decrease in refractive index at the core-cladding interface so that the cladding is of a lower refractive index. The step-index profile corresponds to a power-law index profile with the profile parameter approaching infinity. The step-index profile is used in most single-mode fibers and some multimode fibers.

A step-index fiber is characterized by the core and cladding refractive indices n_{1} and n_{2} and the core and cladding radii a and b. Examples of standard core and cladding diameters 2a/2b are 8/125, 50/125, 62.5/125, 85/125, or 100/140 (units of μm). The fractional refractive-index change $\triangle \, = \frac{n_1 - n_2}{n_1} \ll \ 1$. The value of n_{1} is typically between 1.44 and 1.46, and $\triangle$ is typically between 0.001 and 0.02.

Step-index optical fiber is generally made by doping high-purity fused silica glass (SiO_{2}) with different concentrations of materials like titanium, germanium, or boron.

Modal dispersion in a step index optical fiber is given by

$\text{pulse dispersion} = \frac{\triangle\ n_1\ \ell}{c}\,\!$

where

$\triangle\,\!$ is the fractional index of refraction
$n_1\,\!$ is the refractive index of core
$\ell\,\!$ is the length of the optical fiber under observation
$c$ is the speed of light.

== See also ==
- Graded-index fiber
- Critical angle
- Numerical aperture
