= G.8201 =

ITU-T Recommendation

- Error performance parameters and objectives for multi-operator international paths within optical transport networks
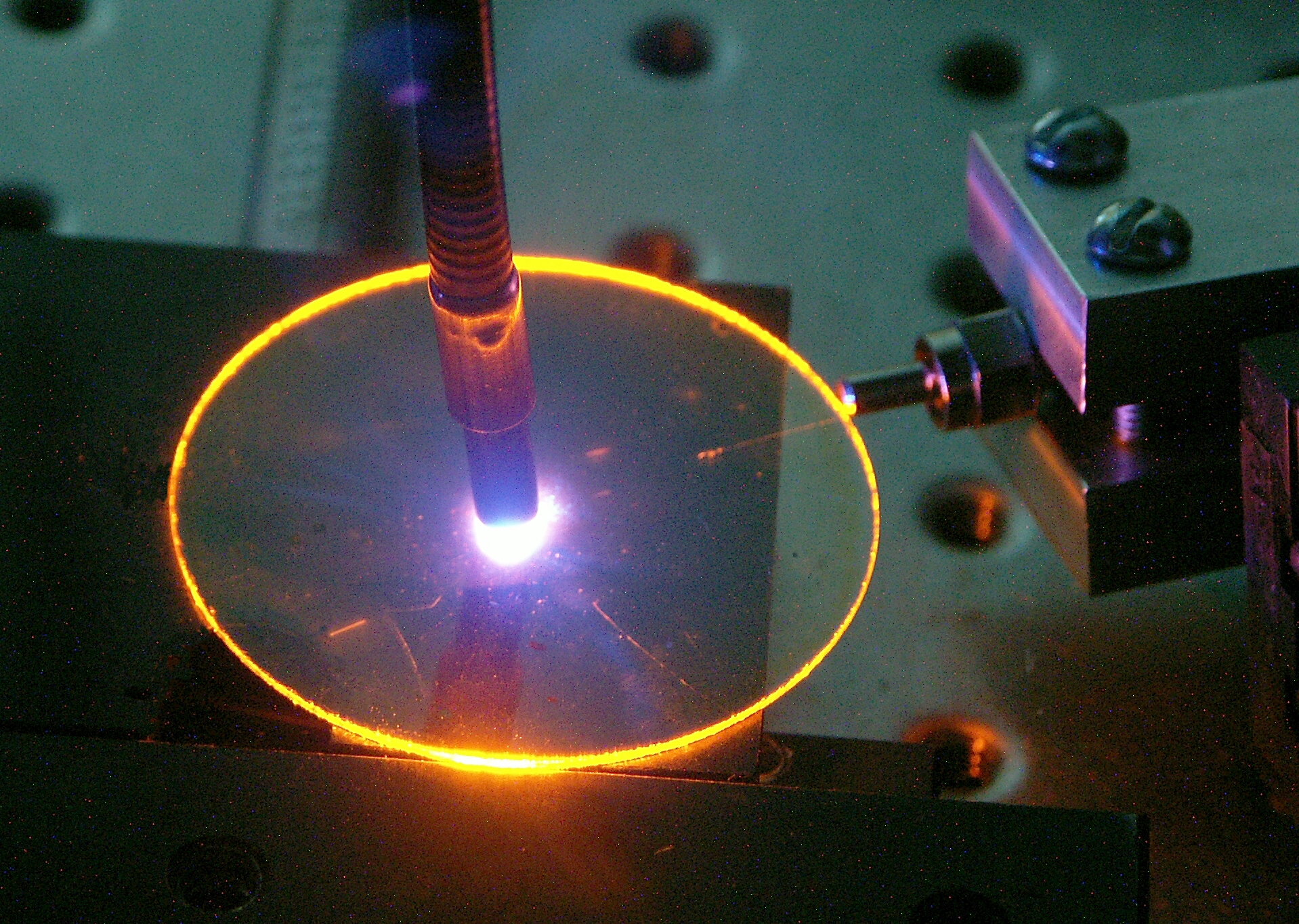
- Status: In force
- Year started: 2003
- Latest version: 2.1; January 2015
- Organization: ITU-T
- Committee: Study Group 15
- Related standards: G.657
- Domain: Optical Transport Network
- Website: www.itu.int/rec/T-REC-G.8201

In Optical Transport Networks, G.8201 is an international standard that defines error performance parameters and objectives for multi-operator international paths.

G.8201 is defined by the International Telecommunications Union's Standardization sector (ITU-T).

== History ==
G.8201 was developed by Study Group 13 of ITU-T in 2003. In 2011 a revised version was published (April 2011).

== Standard ==
The G.8201 standard defines error performance parameters and objectives for international ODUk paths transported by the optical transport network (OTN).

The standard specifically addresses objectives for international ODUk paths. However, the allocation principles can also be applied to the design of error performance for national or private ODUk paths.
