= G.657 =

ITU-T Recommendation

- Characteristics of a bending-loss insensitive single-mode optical fibre and cable
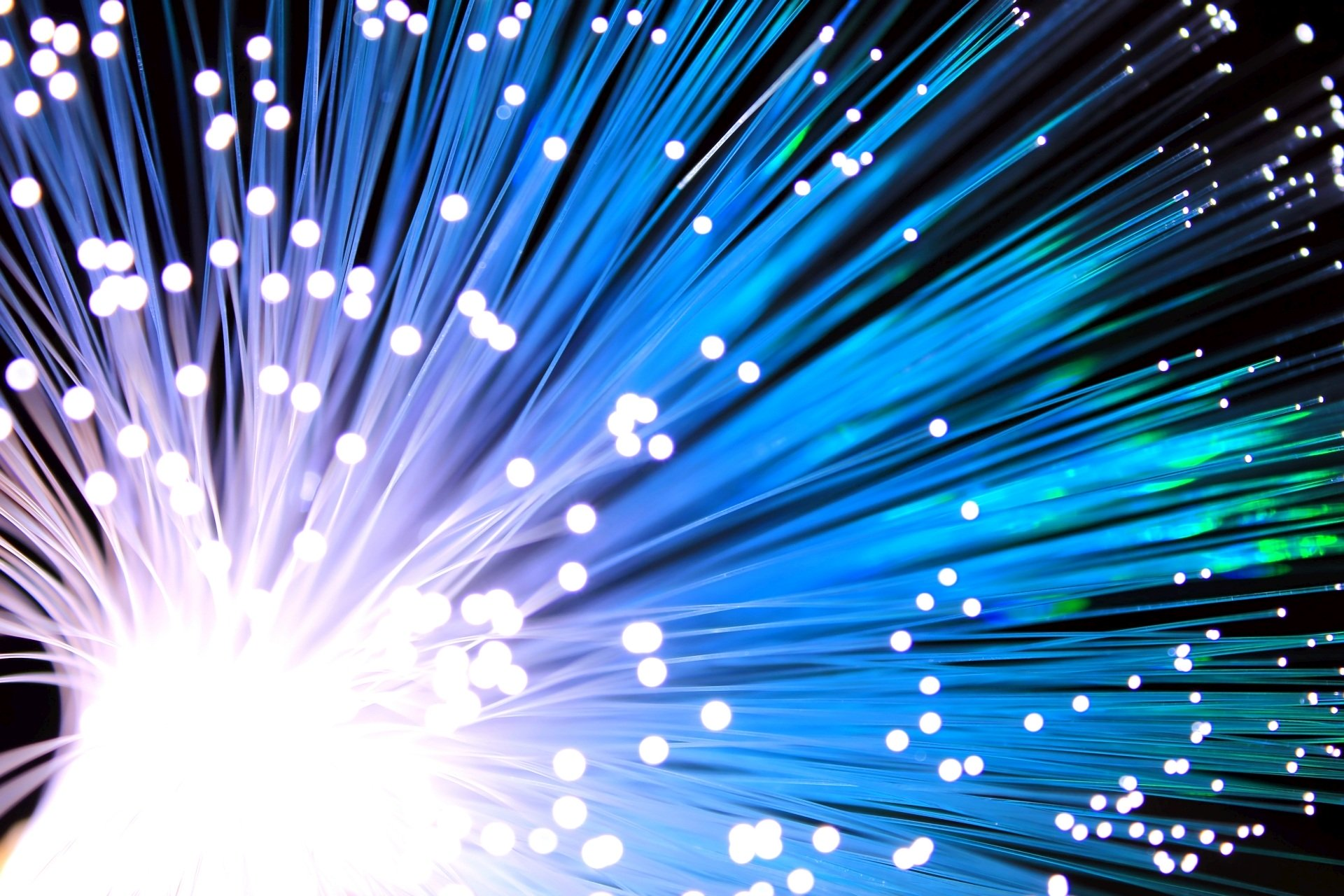
- Fiber Optical Cable
- Status: In force
- Year started: 2006
- Latest version: 5.0; August 2024
- Organization: ITU-T
- Committee: ITU-T Study Group 15
- Related standards: G.651.1, G.652, G.8201
- Domain: telecommunication
- License: Freely available
- Website: https://www.itu.int/rec/T-REC-G.657

G.657 is an international standard developed by the Standardization Sector of the International Telecommunication Union (ITU-T) that specifies single-mode optical fiber (SMF) cable.

== History ==
The G.657 Recommendation builds on a previous fiber optic specification in G.652.

G.657 was first published in 2006. Revisions of the standard were since published in 2009, 2012, 2016, and 2024 (August).
