= Power-law index profile =

Index of refraction profile in fiber optics

For optical fibers, a power-law index profile is an index of refraction profile characterized by

$$n(r) =
\begin{cases}
n_1 \sqrt{1-2\Delta\left({r \over \alpha}\right)^g} & r \le \alpha\\
n_1 \sqrt{1-2\Delta} & r \ge \alpha
\end{cases}$$

where $\Delta = {n_1^2 - n_2^2 \over 2 n_1^2},$

and $n(r)$ is the nominal refractive index as a function of distance from the fiber axis, $n_1$ is the nominal refractive index on axis, $n_2$ is the refractive index of the cladding, which is taken to be homogeneous ($n(r)=n_2 \mathrm{\ for\ } r \ge \alpha$), $\alpha$ is the core radius, and $g$ is a parameter that defines the shape of the profile. $\alpha$ is often used in place of $g$. Hence, this is sometimes called an alpha profile.

For this class of profiles, multimode distortion is smallest when $g$ takes a particular value depending on the material used. For most materials, this optimum value is approximately 2. In the limit of infinite $g$, the profile becomes a step-index profile.

== See also ==
- Graded-index fiber
