= G.652 =

ITU-T Recommendation

- Status: In force
- Year started: 1984
- Latest version: 10.0; August 2024
- Organization: ITU-T
- Committee: Study Group 15
- Related standards: G.651.1, G.655, G.657
- Domain: telecommunication
- License: Freely available
- Website: https://www.itu.int/rec/T-REC-G.652/

G.652 is an international standard that describes the geometrical, mechanical, and transmission attributes of a single-mode optical fibre and cable, developed by the Standardization Sector of the International Telecommunication Union (ITU-T) that specifies the most popular type of single-mode optical fiber (SMF) cable.

== History ==
G.652 was originally developed in 1984 by ITU-T Study Group XV. Subsequently, revisions were published in 1988, 1993, 1997, 2000, 2003, 2005, 2009, 2016, and 2024 (from 1997 as Study Group 15).

== Standard ==
The standard specifies the geometrical, mechanical, and transmission attributes of a single-mode optical fibre as well as its cable. The fibre has zero-dispersion wavelength around 1310 nm as per how it was designed, however it can also be used in the 1550 nm wavelength region.
