= Graded-index fiber =

Optical fiber whose core has a varying refractive index

A graded-index fiber, or gradient-index fiber, is an optical fiber whose core has a refractive index that decreases continuously with increasing radial distance from the optical axis of the fiber, as opposed to a step-index fiber, which has a uniform index of refraction in the core, and a lower index in the surrounding cladding.

Because parts of the core closer to the fiber axis have a higher refractive index than the parts near the cladding, light rays follow sinusoidal paths down the fiber. The most common refractive index profile for a graded-index fiber is very nearly parabolic. The parabolic profile results in continual refocusing of the rays in the core, and minimizes modal dispersion.

Multi-mode optical fiber can be built with either a graded-index or a step-index profile. The advantage of graded-index multi-mode fiber compared to step-index fiber is a considerable decrease in modal dispersion. This means that the trip time of light traversing the fiber is more consistent, allowing shorter and more frequent pulses of light to be discerned by the receiver. Modal dispersion can be further decreased by selecting a smaller core size (less than 10 μm) and forming a single-mode step index fiber.

This type of fiber is normalized by the International Telecommunication Union ITU-T in recommendation G.651.1.

== Pulse dispersion ==
Pulse dispersion in a graded-index optical fiber is given by

$$\mathrm{Pulse~dispersion} = \frac{k \delta n\ n_1\ l}{c} \,\!,$$
where

$\delta n\,\!$ is the difference in refractive indices of core and cladding,

$n_1\,\!$ is the refractive index of the cladding,

$l\,\!$ is the length of the fiber taken for observing the pulse dispersion,

$c \approx 3\times 10^8~\mathrm{m/s}\,\!$ is the speed of light, and

$k\,\!$ is the constant of graded index profile.

== See also ==
- Power-law index profile
- Gradient index optics
