= Modal bandwidth =

Maximum signaling rate for a given distance

Modal bandwidth, in the discipline of telecommunications, refers to the maximal signaling rate for a given distance or – the other way around – the maximal distance for a given signaling rate. The signaling rate can typically be measured in MHz, and the modal bandwidth is the product of bandwidth and distance (typically expressed in MHz·km). For a cable with a certain modal bandwidth, the maximal frequency can be doubled when the distance is halved, and conversely.

The modal bandwidth is derived from the modal dispersion of the fiber and the spectral linewidth of the laser:

$$f_\text{s} \cdot L = \frac{1}{D_\text{chrom.} \cdot \Delta\lambda}.$$

Modal bandwidth is sometimes referred to as EMBc.
