= Polarization mode dispersion =

Form of modal dispersion

Polarization mode dispersion (PMD) is a form of modal dispersion where two different polarizations of light in a waveguide, which normally travel at the same speed, travel at different speeds due to random imperfections and asymmetries, causing random spreading of optical pulses. Unless it is compensated, which is difficult, this ultimately limits the rate at which data can be transmitted over a fiber.

== Overview ==
In an ideal optical fiber, the core has a perfectly circular cross-section. In this case, the fundamental mode has two orthogonal polarizations (orientations of the electric field) that travel at the same speed. The signal that is transmitted over the fiber is randomly polarized, i.e. a random superposition of these two polarizations, but that would not matter in an ideal fiber because the two polarizations would propagate identically (are degenerate).

In a realistic fiber, however, there are random imperfections that break the circular symmetry, causing the two polarizations to propagate with different speeds. In this case, the two polarization components of a signal will slowly separate, e.g. causing pulses to spread and overlap. Because the imperfections are random, the pulse spreading effects correspond to a random walk, and thus have a mean polarization-dependent time-differential Δτ (also called the differential group delay, or DGD) proportional to the square root of propagation distance L:

$\Delta\tau = D_\text{PMD} \sqrt{L} \,$

D_{PMD} is the PMD parameter of the fiber, typically measured in ps/√km, a measure of the strength and frequency of the imperfections.

The symmetry-breaking random imperfections fall into several categories. First, there is geometric asymmetry, e.g. slightly elliptical cores. Second, there are stress-induced material birefringences, in which the refractive index itself depends on the polarization. Both of these effects can stem from either imperfection in manufacturing (which is never perfect or stress-free) or from thermal and mechanical stresses imposed on the fiber in the field — moreover, the latter stresses generally vary over time.

== Compensating for PMD ==
A PMD compensation system is a device which uses a polarization controller to compensate for PMD in fibers. Essentially, one splits the output of the fiber into two principal polarizations (usually those with dτ dω = 0, i.e. no first-order variation of time-delay with frequency), and applies a differential delay to re-synchronize them. Because the PMD effects are random and time-dependent, this requires an active device that responds to feedback over time. Such systems are therefore expensive and complex; combined with the fact that PMD is not yet the limiting factor in the lower data rates still in common use, this means that PMD-compensation systems have seen limited deployment in large-scale telecommunications systems.

Another alternative would be to use a polarization maintaining fiber (PM fiber), a fiber whose symmetry is so strongly broken (e.g. a highly elliptical core) that an input polarization along a principal axis is maintained all the way to the output. Since the second polarization is never excited, PMD does not occur. Such fibers currently have practical problems, however, such as higher losses than ordinary optical fiber and higher cost. An extension of this idea is a single-polarization fiber in which only a single polarization state is allowed to propagate along the fiber (the other polarization is not guided and escapes).

== Related phenomena ==
A related effect is polarization-dependent loss (PDL), in which two polarizations suffer different rates of loss in the fiber due, again, to asymmetries. PDL similarly degrades signal quality.

Strictly speaking, a circular core is not required in order to have two degenerate polarization states. Rather, one requires a core whose symmetry group admits a two-dimensional irreducible representation. For example, a square or equilateral-triangle core would also have two equal-speed polarization solutions for the fundamental mode; such general shapes also arise in photonic-crystal fibers. Again, any random imperfections that break the symmetry would lead to PMD in such a waveguide.

== See also ==
- Optical polarization multiplexing
