= Modal dispersion =

Distortion in some communications media

Modal dispersion is a distortion mechanism occurring in multimode fibers and other waveguides, in which the signal is spread in time because the propagation velocity of the optical signal is not the same for all modes. Other names for this phenomenon include multimode distortion, multimode dispersion, modal distortion, intermodal distortion, intermodal dispersion, and intermodal delay distortion.

In the ray optics analogy, modal dispersion in a step-index optical fiber may be compared to multipath propagation of a radio signal. Rays of light enter the fiber with different angles to the fiber axis, up to the fiber's acceptance angle. Rays that enter with a shallower angle travel by a more direct path, and arrive sooner than rays that enter at a steeper angle (which reflect many more times off the boundaries of the core as they travel the length of the fiber). The arrival of different components of the signal at different times distorts the shape.

Modal dispersion limits the bandwidth of multimode fibers. For example, a typical step-index fiber with a 50 μm core would be limited to approximately 20 MHz for a one kilometer length, in other words, a bandwidth of 20 MHz·km. Modal dispersion may be considerably reduced, but never eliminated, by the use of a core having a graded refractive index profile. However, multimode graded-index fibers having bandwidths exceeding 3.5 GHz·km at 850 nm are now commonly manufactured for use in 10 Gbit/s data links.

Modal dispersion should not be confused with chromatic dispersion, a distortion that results due to the differences in propagation velocity of different wavelengths of light. Modal dispersion occurs even with an ideal, monochromatic light source.

A special case of modal dispersion is polarization mode dispersion (PMD), a fiber dispersion phenomenon usually associated with single-mode fibers. PMD results when two modes that normally travel at the same speed due to fiber core geometric and stress symmetry (for example, two orthogonal polarizations in a waveguide of circular or square cross-section), travel at different speeds due to random imperfections that break the symmetry.

== Troubleshooting ==
In multimode optical fiber with many wavelengths propagating, it is sometimes hard to identify the dispersed wavelength out of all the wavelengths that are present, if there is not yet a service degradation issue. One can compare the present optical power of each wavelength to the designed values and look for differences. After that, the optical fiber is tested end to end. If no loss is found, then most probably there is dispersion with that particular wavelength. Normally engineers start testing the fiber section by section until they reach the affected section; all wavelengths are tested and the affected wavelength produces a loss at the far end of the fiber. One can easily calculate how much of the fiber is affected and replace that part of fiber with a new one. Replacement of optical fiber is only required when there is an intense dispersion and service is being affected; otherwise various methods can be used to compensate for the dispersion.
