= XENPAK =

XENPAK is a multisource agreement (MSA), instigated by Agilent Technologies and Agere Systems, that defines a fiber-optic or wired transceiver module which conforms to the 10 Gigabit Ethernet (10GbE) standard of the Institute of Electrical and Electronics Engineers (IEEE) 802.3 working group. The MSA group received input from both transceiver and equipment manufacturers during the definition process. XENPAK has been replaced by more compact devices providing the same functionality.

== History ==
The XENPAK MSA was publicly announced on March 12, 2001 and the first revision of the document was publicly released on May 7, 2001. The most recent revision of the MSA, Issue 3.0, was published on September 18, 2002. The result covered all physical medium dependent (PMD) types defined by the IEEE at that time for 802.3ae 10GbE.

Although the XENPAK agreement received early support, its modules were thought to be overly large for high-density applications. As of 2010, vendors generally changed to use XFP modules for longer distances, and Enhanced Small Form-factor Pluggable transceivers, known as SFP+ modules, for higher densities. The newer modules have a purely serial interface, compared to the four "lane" XAUI interface used in XENPAK.

== Description ==
XENPAK modules were supplied for physical layer interfaces supporting multi-mode and single mode fiber optic cables and InfiniBand copper cables with connectors known as CX4. Transmission distances vary from 100 metres (330 ft) to 80 kilometres (50 mi) for fiber and up to 15 metres (49 ft) on CX4 cable. Newer XENPAKs using the 10GBase-LX4 standard operated using multiple wavelengths on legacy multi-mode fibers at distances of up to 300 metres (980 ft), eliminating the need to reinstall cable in a building when upgrading certain 1 Gbit/s circuits to 10 Gbit/s.

== Replacement form factors ==
The XENPAK form factor was initially supported by numerous network equipment manufacturers and module makers. However, advances in technology led to more compact form factors for 10 Gigabit Ethernet applications. Soon after the standard was introduced in 2001, two related standards emerged: XPAK and X2. These two standards have the same electrical interface as XENPAK (known as XAUI) but different mechanical properties.

The XPAK group was announced on March 19, 2002, first published their specification on May 24, 2002, and version 2.3 on August 1, 2003.

The X2 group was announced on July 22, 2002, and published their specification on February 13, 2003. Issue 3.0 of the XENPAK MSA was transferred to the Small Form Factor committee as document INF-8474 on September 18, 2002.

The XENPAK MSA website existed through the end of 2008.

== Use with modern optics ==
As of 2014, adapters are available that permit use of any modern SFP+ 10 Gbit/s optic in a XENPAK interface.
