= XFP transceiver =

Modular optical fiber communications interface

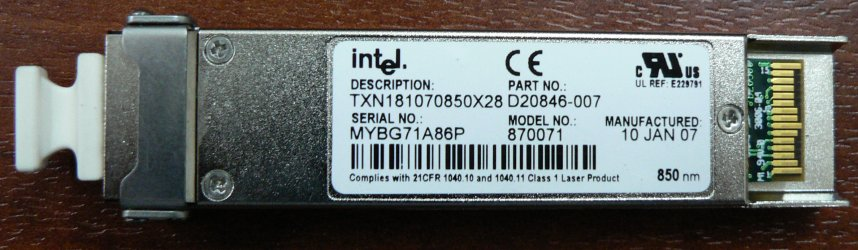
Intel XFP Transceiver (MultiMode Fiber Optics)

The XFP (10 gigabit small form-factor pluggable (Note: X is the Roman numeral for 10 in 10 gigabit.)) is a standard for transceivers for high-speed computer network and telecommunication links that use optical fiber. It was defined by an industry group in 2002, along with its interface to other electrical components, which is called XFI.

XFP is a slightly larger form factor than the popular Small Form-factor Pluggable transceiver, SFP and SFP+, and its host interface consists of 30 pins instead of SFP's 20.

== Description ==
XFP modules are hot swappable and support multiple physical layer variants. They typically operate at near-infrared wavelengths (colors) of 850 nm, 1310 nm or 1550 nm. XFP modules use an LC fiber connector type to achieve higher density.

Principal applications include 10 Gigabit Ethernet, 10 Gbit/s Fibre Channel, synchronous optical networking (SONET) at OC-192 rates, synchronous optical networking STM-64, 10 Gbit/s Optical Transport Network (OTN) OTU-2, and parallel optics links. They can operate over a single wavelength or use dense wavelength-division multiplexing techniques. They include digital diagnostics that provide management that were added to the SFF-8472 standard.

The XFP specification was developed by the XFP Multi Source Agreement Group. It is an informal agreement of an industry group, not officially endorsed by any standards body. The first preliminary specification was published on March 27, 2002. The first public release was on July 19, 2002. It was adopted on March 3, 2003, and updated with minor updates through August 31, 2005.

The chair of the XFP group was Robert Snively of Brocade Communications Systems, and technical editor was Ali Ghiasi of Broadcom. The organization's web site was maintained until 2009.

== XFI ==
The XFI electrical interface specification is a 10 gigabit per second chip-to-chip electrical interface specification defined as part of the XFP multi-source agreement. It was also developed by the XFP MSA group. XFI is sometimes pronounced as "X" "F" "I" and other times as "ziffie".

XFI provides a single lane running at 10.3125 Gbit/s when using a 64B/66B encoding scheme. A serializer/deserializer is often used to convert between XFI and a wider interface such as XAUI that has four lanes running at 3.125 Gbit/s using 8B/10B encoding.

== Mechanical dimensions ==
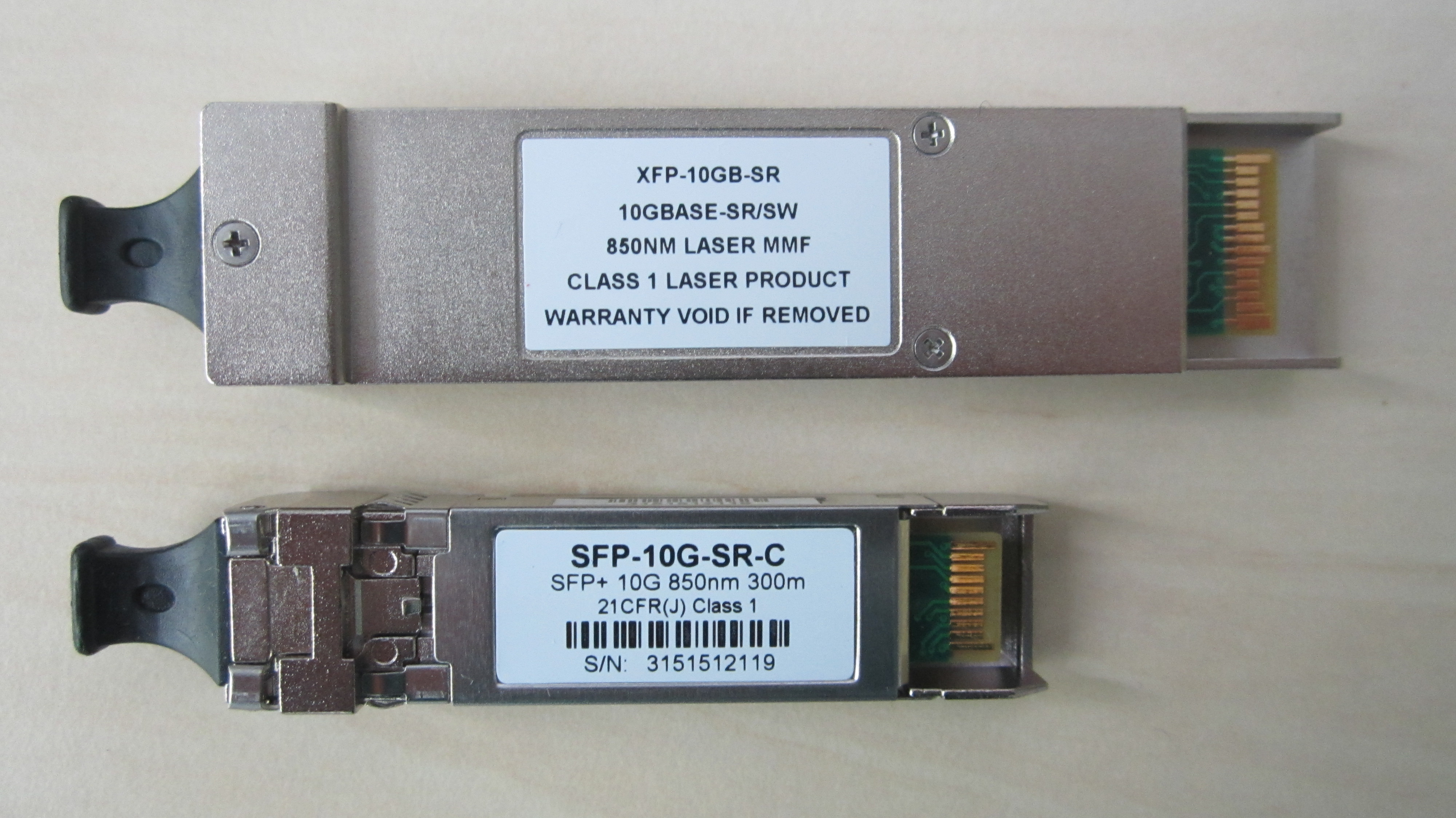
A 10 Gigabit Ethernet XFP transceiver and a SFP+ transceiver side by side.

The physical dimensions of the XFP transceiver are slightly larger than the original Small Form-factor Pluggable transceiver (SFP). One of the reasons for the increase in size is to allow for on-board heat sinks for more cooling.

Dimensions
| | XFP | SFP (for comparison) |
|---|---|---|
| Height | 8.5 mm (0.33 inches) | 8.5 mm (0.33 inches) |
| Width | 18.35 mm (0.72 inches) | 13.4 mm (0.53 inches) |
| Depth | 78.0 mm (3.10 inches) | 56.5 mm (2.22 inches) |

== Types ==
XFP are available with a variety of transmitter and receiver types, allowing users to select the appropriate transceiver for each link to provide the required optical reach over the available optical fiber type (e.g. multi-mode fiber or single-mode fiber). XFP modules are commonly available in several different categories:

- SR - 850 nm, for a maximum of 300 m
- LR - 1310 nm, for distances up to 10 km
- ER - 1550 nm, for distances up to 40 km
- ZR - 1550 nm, for distances up to 80 km

The XFP packaging was smaller than the XENPAK form-factor which had been published earlier (by almost a year). Some vendors supported both, or the XENPAK follow-ons called XPAK and X2.

== See also ==
- Gigabit interface converter (GBIC)
- QSFP
