= 10 Gigabit Ethernet =

Standards for Ethernet at ten times the speed of Gigabit Ethernet

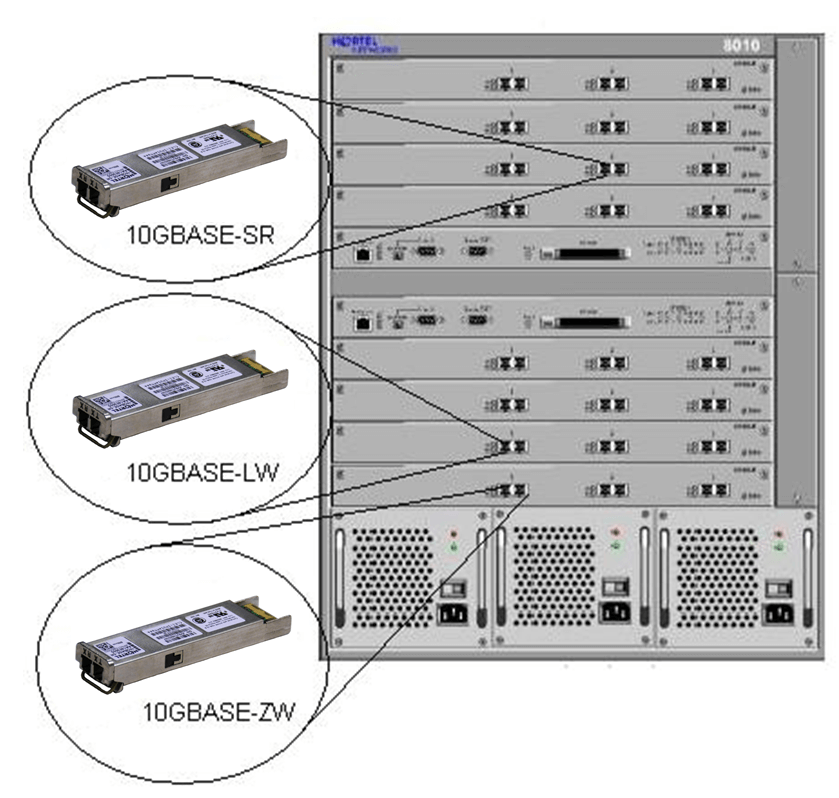
Router with two dozen 10 Gigabit Ethernet ports and three types of physical-layer module

10 Gigabit Ethernet (10GE, 10GbE, or 10 GigE) is a group of computer networking technologies for transmitting Ethernet frames at a rate of 10 gigabits per second. It was first defined by the IEEE 802.3ae-2002 standard. Unlike previous Ethernet standards, 10GbE defines only full-duplex point-to-point links which are generally connected by network switches; shared-medium CSMA/CD operation has not been carried over from the previous generations of Ethernet standards so half-duplex operation and repeater hubs do not exist in 10GbE. The first standard for faster 100 Gigabit Ethernet links was approved in 2010.

The 10GbE standard encompasses a number of different physical layer (PHY) standards. A networking device, such as a switch or a network interface controller may have different PHY types through pluggable PHY modules, such as those based on SFP+. Like previous versions of Ethernet, 10GbE can use either copper or fiber cabling. Maximum distance over copper cable is 100 meters but because of its bandwidth requirements, higher-grade cables are required. (Note: Category 6 cable supports runs up to 55 meters. Category 6A or higher is good for lengths up to 100 meters.)

The adoption of 10GbE has been more gradual than previous revisions of Ethernet: in 2007, one million 10GbE ports were shipped, in 2009 two million ports were shipped, and in 2010 over three million ports were shipped, with an estimated nine million ports in 2011. As of 2012, although the price per gigabit of bandwidth for 10GbE was about one-third compared to Gigabit Ethernet, the price per port of 10GbE still hindered more widespread adoption.

In 2017, Apple made built-in 10 Gigabit Ethernet standard in their iMac Pro.

By 2022, the price per port of 10GBASE‑T had dropped to $50–$100 depending on scale. In 2023, Wi-Fi 7 routers began appearing with 10GbE WAN ports as standard.

== Standards ==
Over the years the Institute of Electrical and Electronics Engineers (IEEE) 802.3 working group has published several standards relating to 10GbE.

Standard	Publication year	Description
802.3ae	2002	10 Gbit/s Ethernet over fiber for LAN (10GBASE-SR), WAN (10GBASE-LR, 10GBASE-ER, 10GBASE-LX4), and SDH/SONET-compatible WAN (10GBASE-SW, 10GBASE-LW, 10GBASE-EW)
802.3ak	2004	10GBASE-CX4 10 Gbit/s Ethernet over twinaxial cabling
802.3-2005	2005	A revision of base standard incorporating 802.3ae, 802.3ak and errata
802.3an	2006	10GBASE-T 10 Gbit/s Ethernet over copper twisted pair cable
802.3ap	2007	Backplane Ethernet, 1 and 10 Gbit/s over printed circuit boards (10GBASE-KR and 10GBASE-KX4)
802.3aq	2006	10GBASE-LRM 10 Gbit/s Ethernet over multi-mode fiber with enhanced equalization
802.3-2008	2008	A revision of base standard incorporating the 802.3an/ap/aq/as amendments, two corrigenda and errata. Link aggregation moved to 802.1AX.
802.3av	2009	10GBASE-PR 10 Gbit/s Ethernet PHY for EPON
802.3-2015	2015	The previous version of the base standard
802.3bz	2016	2.5 Gigabit and 5 Gigabit Ethernet over Cat-5/Cat-6 twisted pair – 2.5GBASE-T and 5GBASE-T
802.3-2018	2018	The previous version of the base standard
802.3ch	2020	Physical Layer Specifications and Management Parameters for 2.5, 5 and 10 Gbit/s Automotive Electrical Ethernet (10GBASE-T1)
802.3-2022	2022	The latest version of the base standard incorporating previous amendments

== Physical layer modules ==
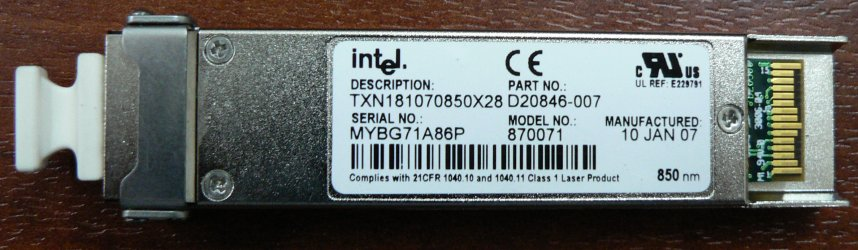
Closeup of a 10 Gigabit Ethernet XFP transceiver

To implement different 10GbE physical layer standards, many interfaces consist of a standard socket into which different physical (PHY) layer modules may be plugged. PHY modules are not specified in an official standards body but by multi-source agreements (MSAs) that can be negotiated more quickly. Relevant MSAs for 10GbE include XENPAK (and related X2 and XPAK), XFP and SFP+. When choosing a PHY module, a designer considers cost, reach, media type, power consumption, and size (form factor). A single point-to-point link can have different MSA pluggable formats on either end (e.g., XPAK and SFP+) as long as the 10GbE optical or copper port type (e.g. 10GBASE-SR) supported by the pluggable is identical.

XENPAK was the first MSA for 10GE and had the largest form factor. X2 and XPAK were later competing standards with smaller form factors. X2 and XPAK have not been as successful in the market as XENPAK. XFP came after X2 and XPAK, and it is also smaller.

The 10-gigabit module standard is the Enhanced Small Form-factor Pluggable transceiver, generally called SFP+. Based on the Small Form-factor Pluggable (SFP) transceiver and developed by the ANSI T11 fibre channel group, it is smaller still and lower power than XFP. SFP+ has become the most popular socket on 10GE systems. SFP+ modules do only optical to electrical conversion, no clock and data recovery, putting a higher burden on the host's channel equalization. SFP+ modules share a common physical form factor with legacy SFP modules, allowing higher port density than XFP and the re-use of existing designs for 24 or 48 ports in a 19-inch rack width blade.

Optical modules are connected to a host by either a XAUI, XFI or SerDes Framer Interface (SFI) interface. XENPAK, X2, and XPAK modules use XAUI to connect to their hosts. XAUI (XGXS) uses a four-lane data channel and is specified in IEEE 802.3 Clause 47. XFP modules use an XFI interface, and SFP+ modules use an SFI interface. XFI and SFI use a single-lane data channel and the 64b/66b encoding specified in IEEE 802.3 Clause 49.

SFP+ modules can further be grouped into two types of host interfaces: linear or limiting. Limiting modules are preferred except for long-reach applications using 10GBASE-LRM modules.

Legend for fibre-based PHYs
Fibre type	Introduced	Performance
MMF FDDI 62.5/125 µm	1987	160 MHz·km @ 850 nm
MMF OM1 62.5/125 µm	1989	200 MHz·km @ 850 nm
MMF OM2 50/125 µm	1998	500 MHz·km @ 850 nm
MMF OM3 50/125 µm	2003	1500 MHz·km @ 850 nm
MMF OM4 50/125 µm	2008	3500 MHz·km @ 850 nm
MMF OM5 50/125 µm	2016	3500 MHz·km @ 850 nm and 1850 MHz·km @ 950 nm
SMF OS1 9/125 µm	1998	1.0 dB/km @ 1300/1550 nm
SMF OS2 9/125 µm	2000	0.4 dB/km @ 1300/1550 nm

Name	Standard	Status	Media	Connector	Transceiver module	Reach (m)	# Media (⇆)	# Lambdas (→)	# Lanes (→)	Notes
10 Gigabit Ethernet (10 GbE) - (Data rate: 10 Gbit/s - Line code: 64b/66b × NRZ - Line rate: 10.3125 GBd - Full-Duplex)
10GBASE-KX4	802.3ap-2007 (CL48/71)	legacy	Cu-Backplane	—N/a	—N/a	1	4	N/A	4	PCBs; Line code: 8b/10b × NRZ; Line rate: 4× 3.125 GBd = 12.5 GBd
10GBASE-KR	802.3ap-2007 (CL49/72)	current	Cu-Backplane	—N/a	—N/a	1	1	1	1	PCBs
10GPASS-XR	802.3bn-2016 (CL100-102)	current	Coax	—N/a	—N/a	?	1	1	1	EPON Protocol over Coax (EPoC) – up to 10 Gbit/s downstream and 1.6 Gbit/s upstream for a passive optical, point-to-multipoint network using passband OFDM with up to 16384-QAM
10GBASE-CX4	802.3ak-2004 (CL48/54)	legacy	Twinaxial balanced	CX4 (SFF-8470) (IEC 61076-3-113) (IB)	~~XENPAK~~; X2; XFP	15	4	N/A	4	Data centers; Line code: 8b/10b × NRZ; Line rate: 4× 3.125 GBd = 12.5 GBd
10GSFP+Cu; Direct Attach	SFF-8431 (2006)	current	Twinaxial balanced, Fibre (AOC)	SFP+ (SFF-8431)	SFP+	7; 15; 100	1	1	1	Data centers; Cable types: passive twinaxial (7 m), active (15 m), active optical (AOC): (100 m)
10GBASE-SRL	proprietary (non IEEE)	current	Fibre; 850 nm	SC; LC	SFP+ XENPAK; X2; XFP	OM1: 11	2	1	1	
10GBASE-SRL	proprietary (non IEEE)	current	Fibre; 850 nm	SC; LC	SFP+ XENPAK; X2; XFP	OM2: 27	2	1	1	
10GBASE-SRL	proprietary (non IEEE)	current	Fibre; 850 nm	SC; LC	SFP+ XENPAK; X2; XFP	OM3: 100	2	1	1	
10GBASE-SRL	proprietary (non IEEE)	current	Fibre; 850 nm	SC; LC	SFP+ XENPAK; X2; XFP	OM4: 150	2	1	1	
10GBASE-SR	802.3ae-2002 (CL49/52)	current	Fibre; 850 nm	SC; LC	SFP+ XENPAK; X2; XPAK; XFP	OM1: 33	2	1	1	Modal bandwidth (reach): 160 MHz·km (26 m), 200 MHz·km (33 m), 400 MHz·km (66 m), 500 MHz·km (82 m), 2000 MHz·km (300 m), 4700 MHz·km (400 m)
10GBASE-SR	802.3ae-2002 (CL49/52)	current	Fibre; 850 nm	SC; LC	SFP+ XENPAK; X2; XPAK; XFP	OM2: 82	2	1	1	Modal bandwidth (reach): 160 MHz·km (26 m), 200 MHz·km (33 m), 400 MHz·km (66 m), 500 MHz·km (82 m), 2000 MHz·km (300 m), 4700 MHz·km (400 m)
10GBASE-SR	802.3ae-2002 (CL49/52)	current	Fibre; 850 nm	SC; LC	SFP+ XENPAK; X2; XPAK; XFP	OM3: 300	2	1	1	Modal bandwidth (reach): 160 MHz·km (26 m), 200 MHz·km (33 m), 400 MHz·km (66 m), 500 MHz·km (82 m), 2000 MHz·km (300 m), 4700 MHz·km (400 m)
10GBASE-SR	802.3ae-2002 (CL49/52)	current	Fibre; 850 nm	SC; LC	SFP+ XENPAK; X2; XPAK; XFP	OM4: 400	2	1	1	Modal bandwidth (reach): 160 MHz·km (26 m), 200 MHz·km (33 m), 400 MHz·km (66 m), 500 MHz·km (82 m), 2000 MHz·km (300 m), 4700 MHz·km (400 m)
10GBASE-LRM	802.3aq-2006 (CL49/68)	current	Fibre; 1300 nm	SC; LC	SFP+ XENPAK; X2	OM1: 220	2	1	1	Modal bandwidth: 500 MHz·km OS1 and OS2 up to 300 meter is supported by Cisco and FS, although not specified in the standard.
10GBASE-LRM	802.3aq-2006 (CL49/68)	current	Fibre; 1300 nm	SC; LC	SFP+ XENPAK; X2	OM3: 220	2	1	1	Modal bandwidth: 500 MHz·km OS1 and OS2 up to 300 meter is supported by Cisco and FS, although not specified in the standard.
10GBASE-LX4	802.3ae-2002 (CL48/53)	legacy	Fibre; 1269.0 – 1282.4 nm 1293.5 – 1306.9 nm 1318.0 – 1331.4 nm 1342.5 – 1355.9 nm	SC	XENPAK; X2	OM2: 300	2	4	4	WDM; Line code: 8b/10b × NRZ; Line rate: 4× 3.125 GBd = 12.5 GBd; Modal bandwidth: 500 MHz·km
10GBASE-LX4	802.3ae-2002 (CL48/53)	legacy	Fibre; 1269.0 – 1282.4 nm 1293.5 – 1306.9 nm 1318.0 – 1331.4 nm 1342.5 – 1355.9 nm	SC	XENPAK; X2	OS2: 10k	2	4	4	WDM; Line code: 8b/10b × NRZ; Line rate: 4× 3.125 GBd = 12.5 GBd; Modal bandwidth: 500 MHz·km
10GBASE-SW	802.3ae-2002 (CL50/52)	current	Fibre; 850 nm	SC; LC	SFP+ XPAK	OM1: 33	2	1	1	WAN; WAN-PHY; Line rate: 9.5846 GBd direct mapping as OC-192 / STM-64 SONET/SDH streams. -ZW: -EW with higher performance optics
10GBASE-SW	802.3ae-2002 (CL50/52)	current	Fibre; 850 nm	SC; LC	SFP+ XPAK	OM2: 82	2	1	1	WAN; WAN-PHY; Line rate: 9.5846 GBd direct mapping as OC-192 / STM-64 SONET/SDH streams. -ZW: -EW with higher performance optics
10GBASE-SW	802.3ae-2002 (CL50/52)	current	Fibre; 850 nm	SC; LC	SFP+ XPAK	OM3: 300	2	1	1	WAN; WAN-PHY; Line rate: 9.5846 GBd direct mapping as OC-192 / STM-64 SONET/SDH streams. -ZW: -EW with higher performance optics
10GBASE-SW	802.3ae-2002 (CL50/52)	current	Fibre; 850 nm	SC; LC	SFP+ XPAK	OM4: 400	2	1	1	WAN; WAN-PHY; Line rate: 9.5846 GBd direct mapping as OC-192 / STM-64 SONET/SDH streams. -ZW: -EW with higher performance optics
10GBASE-LW	802.3ae-2002 (CL50/52)	current	Fibre; 1310 nm	SC; LC	SFP+ XENPAK; XPAK	OS2: 10k	2	1	1	WAN; WAN-PHY; Line rate: 9.5846 GBd direct mapping as OC-192 / STM-64 SONET/SDH streams. -ZW: -EW with higher performance optics
10GBASE-EW	802.3ae-2002 (CL50/52)	current	Fibre; 1550 nm	SC; LC	SFP+	OS2: 40k	2	1	1	WAN; WAN-PHY; Line rate: 9.5846 GBd direct mapping as OC-192 / STM-64 SONET/SDH streams. -ZW: -EW with higher performance optics
10GBASE-ZW	proprietary (non IEEE)	current	Fibre; 1550 nm	SC; LC	SFP+	OS2: 80k	2	1	1	WAN; WAN-PHY; Line rate: 9.5846 GBd direct mapping as OC-192 / STM-64 SONET/SDH streams. -ZW: -EW with higher performance optics
10GBASE-LR	802.3ae-2002 (CL49/52)	current	Fibre; 1310 nm	SC; LC	SFP+ XENPAK; X2; XPAK; XFP	OS2: 10k	2	1	1	
10GBASE-PR	802.3av-2009	current	Fibre dn2up: 1270 nm up2dn: 1577 nm	SC	SFP+ XFP	OS2: 20k	1	1	1	10G EPON
10GBASE-ER	802.3ae-2002 (CL49/52)	current	Fibre; 1550 nm	SC; LC	SFP+ XENPAK; X2; XFP	OS2: 40k	2	1	1	
10GBASE-ZR	proprietary (non IEEE)	current	Fibre; 1550 nm	SC; LC	SFP+ XENPAK; X2; XFP	OS2: 80k	2	1	1	-ER with higher performance optics

Comparison of twisted-pair-based Ethernet physical transport layers (TP-PHYs)
Name	Standard	Status	Speed (Mbit/s)	Pairs required	Lanes per direction	Spectral efficiency ((bit/s)/Hz)	Line code	Symbol rate per lane (MBd)	Bandwidth (MHz)	Max distance (m)	Cable	Cable rating (MHz)	Usage
10GBASE-T	802.3an-2006 (CL55)	current	10,000	4	4	6.25	64b/65b PAM-16 128-DSQ, LDPC-FEC	800	400	100	Cat 6A	500	LAN, Data center
10GBASE-T1	802.3ch-2020 (CL149)	current	10,000	1	1	3.55̅	64b/65b PAM-4 RS-FEC	5,625	2,812.5	15	SPE	4,000	Automotive, IoT, M2M

== Optical fiber ==
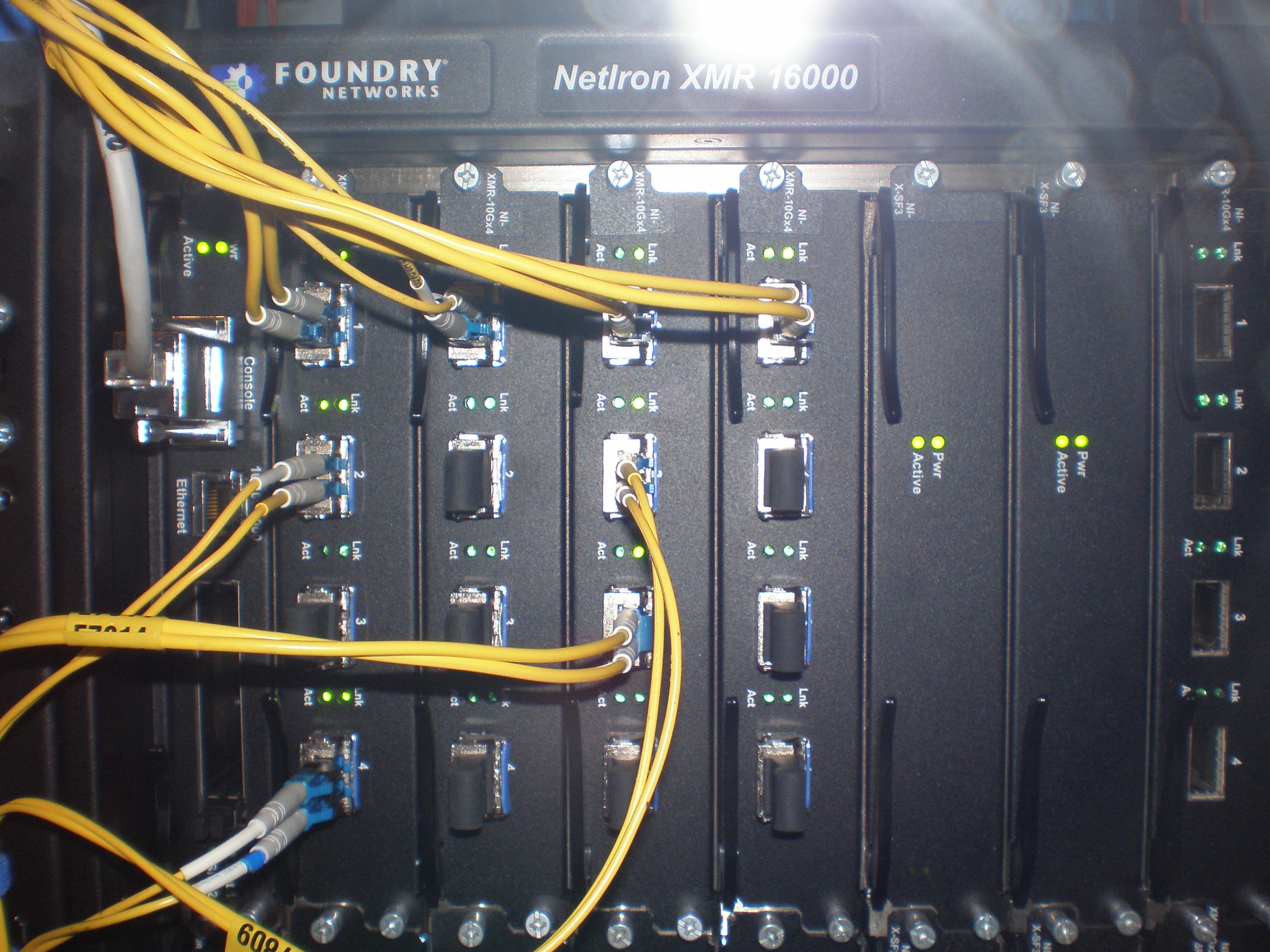
A Foundry Networks router with 10 Gigabit Ethernet optical interfaces (XFP transceiver). The yellow cables are single-mode duplex fiber optic connections.

There are two basic types of optical fiber used for 10 Gigabit Ethernet: single-mode (SMF) and multi-mode (MMF). In SMF light follows a single path through the fiber while in MMF it takes multiple paths resulting in differential mode delay (DMD). SMF is used for long-distance communication and MMF is used for distances of less than 300 m. SMF has a narrower core (8.3 μm) which requires a more precise termination and connection method. MMF has a wider core (50 or 62.5 μm). The advantage of MMF is that it can be driven by a low cost Vertical-cavity surface-emitting laser (VCSEL) for short distances, and multi-mode connectors are cheaper and easier to terminate reliably in the field. The advantage of SMF is that it can work over longer distances.

In the 802.3 standard, reference is made to FDDI-grade MMF fiber. This has a 62.5 μm core and a minimum modal bandwidth of 160 MHz·km at 850 nm. It was originally installed in the early 1990s for FDDI and 100BASE-FX networks. The 802.3 standard also references ISO/IEC 11801 which specifies optical MMF fiber types OM1, OM2, OM3 and OM4. OM1 has a 62.5 μm core while the others have a 50 μm core. At 850 nm the minimum modal bandwidth of OM1 is 200 MHz·km, of OM2 500 MHz·km, of OM3 2000 MHz·km and of OM4 4700 MHz·km. FDDI-grade cable is now obsolete and new structured cabling installations use either OM3 or OM4 cabling. OM3 cable can carry 10 Gigabit Ethernet 300 meters using low cost 10GBASE-SR optics. OM4 can manage 400 meters.

To distinguish SMF from MMF cables, SMF cables are usually yellow, while MMF cables are orange (OM1 & OM2) or aqua (OM3 & OM4). However, in fiber optics, there is no uniform color for any specific optical speed or technology, with the exception being the angled physical contact connector (APC), being an agreed-upon color of green.

=== 10GBASE-SR ===
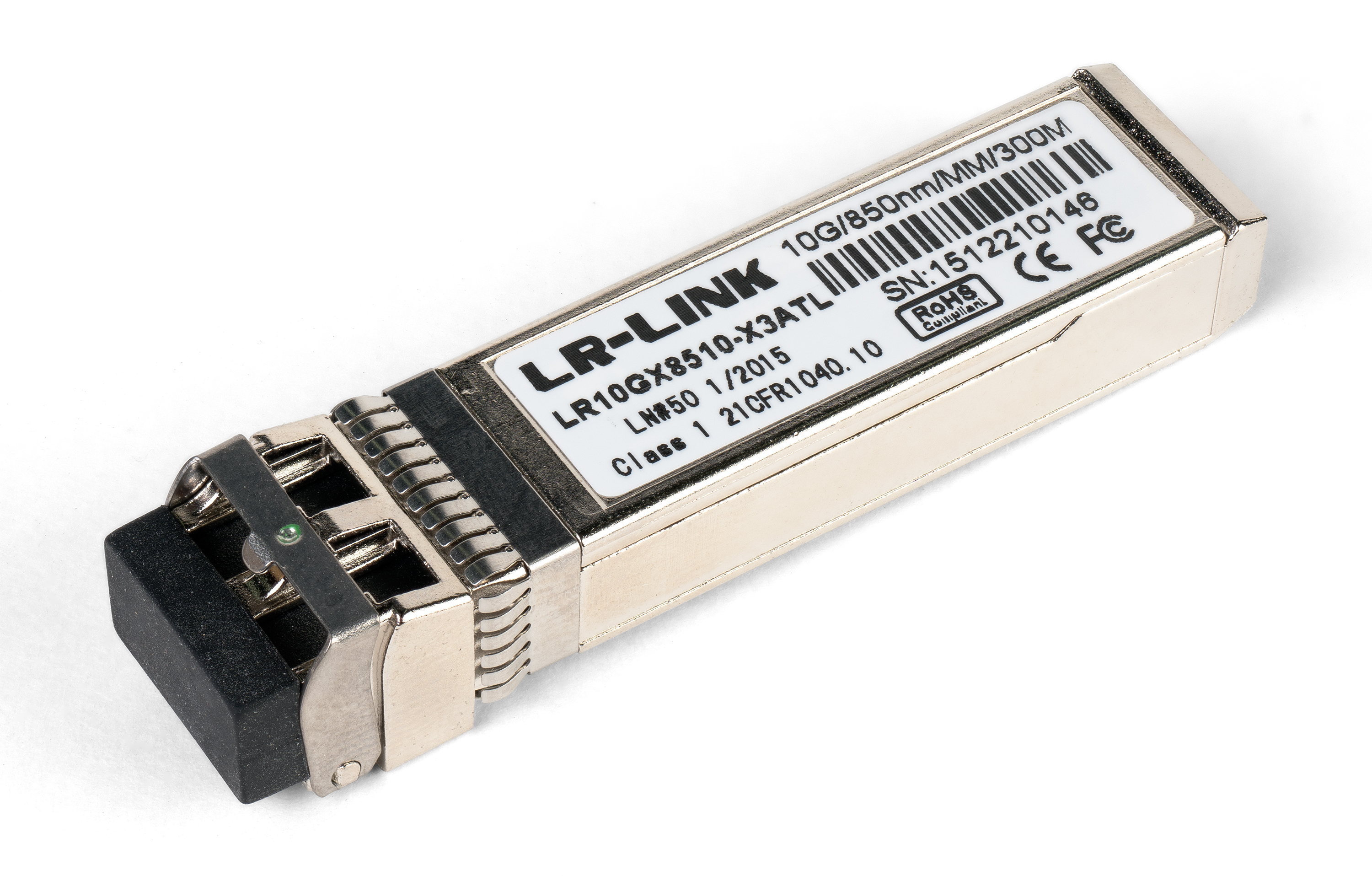
A 10GBASE-SR SFP+ transceiver

10GBASE-SR ("short range") is a port type for multi-mode fiber and uses 850 nm lasers. Its Physical Coding Sublayer (PCS) is 64b/66b and is defined in IEEE 802.3 Clause 49 and its Physical Medium Dependent (PMD) sublayer in Clause 52. It delivers serialized data at a line rate of 10.3125 GBd.

The range depends on the type of multi-mode fiber used.

Fibre type (micrometers)	Range (m)
FDDI-grade (62.5)	26
OM1 (62.5)	33
OM2 (50)	82
OM3	300
OM4	400

MMF has the advantage over SMF of having lower-cost connectors; its wider core requires less mechanical precision.

The 10GBASE-SR transmitter is implemented with a VCSEL, which is low cost and low power. OM3 and OM4 optical cabling are sometimes described as laser optimized because they have been designed to work with VCSELs. 10GBASE-SR delivers the lowest cost, lowest power and smallest form factor optical modules.

There is a lower cost, lower power variant sometimes referred to as 10GBASE-SRL (10GBASE-SR lite). This is inter-operable with 10GBASE-SR but only has a reach of 100 meters.

=== 10GBASE-LR ===
10GBASE-LR (long reach) is a port type for single-mode fiber and uses 1310 nm lasers. Its 64b/66b PCS is defined in IEEE 802.3 Clause 49 and its PMD sublayer in Clause 52. It delivers serialized data at a line rate of 10.3125 GBd.

The 10GBASE-LR transmitter is implemented with a Fabry–Pérot or distributed feedback laser (DFB). DFB lasers are more expensive than VCSELs, but their high power and longer wavelength allow efficient coupling into the small core of single-mode fiber over greater distances.

10GBASE-LR maximum fiber length is 10 kilometers, although this will vary depending on the type of single-mode fiber used.

=== 10GBASE-LRM ===
10GBASE-LRM, (long reach multi-mode) originally specified in IEEE 802.3aq is a port type for multi-mode fiber and uses 1310 nm lasers. Its 64b/66b PCS is defined in IEEE 802.3 Clause 49 and its PMD sublayer in Clause 68. It delivers serialized data at a line rate of 10.3125 GBd. 10GBASE-LRM uses electronic dispersion compensation (EDC) for receive equalization.

10GBASE-LRM allows distances up to 220 metres (720 ft) on FDDI-grade multi-mode fiber and the same 220 m maximum reach on OM1, OM2 and OM3 fiber types. 10GBASE-LRM reach is not quite as far as the older 10GBASE-LX4 standard. Some 10GBASE-LRM transceivers also allow distances up to 300 metres (980 ft) on standard single-mode fiber (SMF, G.652), however this is not part of the IEEE or MSA specification. To ensure that specifications are met over FDDI-grade, OM1 and OM2 fibers, the transmitter should be coupled through a mode conditioning patch cord. No mode conditioning patch cord is required for applications over OM3 or OM4.

=== 10GBASE-ER ===
10GBASE-ER (extended reach) is a port type for single-mode fiber and uses 1550 nm lasers. Its 64b/66b PCS is defined in IEEE 802.3 Clause 49 and its PMD sublayer in Clause 52. It delivers serialized data at a line rate of 10.3125 GBd.

The 10GBASE-ER transmitter is implemented with an externally modulated laser (EML).

10GBASE-ER has a reach of 40 kilometres (25 mi) over engineered links and 30 km over standard links.

=== 10GBASE-ZR ===
Several manufacturers have introduced 80 km (50 mi) range under the name 10GBASE-ZR. This 80 km PHY is not specified within the IEEE 802.3ae standard and manufacturers have created their own specifications based upon the 80 km PHY described in the OC-192/STM-64 SDH/SONET specifications.

=== 10GBASE-LX4 ===
10GBASE-LX4 is a port type for multi-mode fiber and single-mode fiber. It uses four separate laser sources operating at 3.125 Gbit/s and Coarse wavelength-division multiplexing with four unique wavelengths around 1310 nm. Its 8b/10b PCS is defined in IEEE 802.3 Clause 48 and its Physical Medium Dependent (PMD) sublayer in Clause 53.

10GBASE-LX4 has a range of 10 kilometres (6.2 mi) over SMF. It can reach 300 metres (980 ft) over FDDI-grade, OM1, OM2 and OM3 multi-mode cabling. (Note: All these fiber types are specified to have a minimum modal bandwidth of 500 MHz·km at 1300 nm.) In this case, it needs to be coupled through an SMF offset-launch mode-conditioning patch cord.

=== 10GBASE-PR ===
10GBASE-PR originally specified in IEEE 802.3av is a 10 Gigabit Ethernet PHY for passive optical networks and uses 1577 nm lasers in the downstream direction and 1270 nm lasers in the upstream direction. Its PMD sublayer is specified in Clause 75. Downstream delivers serialized data at a line rate of 10.3125 Gbit/s in a point-to-multipoint configuration.

10GBASE-PR has three power budgets specified as 10GBASE-PR10, 10GBASE-PR20 and 10GBASE-PR30.

=== 10GBASE-BR ===
Multiple vendors introduced single-strand, bi-directional 10 Gbit/s optics capable of a single-mode fiber connection functionally equivalent to 10GBASE-LR or -ER, but using a single strand of fiber optic cable. Analogous to 1000BASE-BX10, this is accomplished using a passive prism inside each optical transceiver and a matched pair of transceivers using two different wavelengths such as 1270 and 1330 nm. Modules are available in varying transmit powers and reach distances ranging from 10 to 80 km.

These advances were subsequently standardized in IEEE 802.3cp-2021 with reaches of 10, 20, or 40 km.

== Copper ==
10 Gigabit Ethernet can also run over twin-axial cabling, twisted pair cabling, and backplanes.

=== 10GBASE-CX4 ===
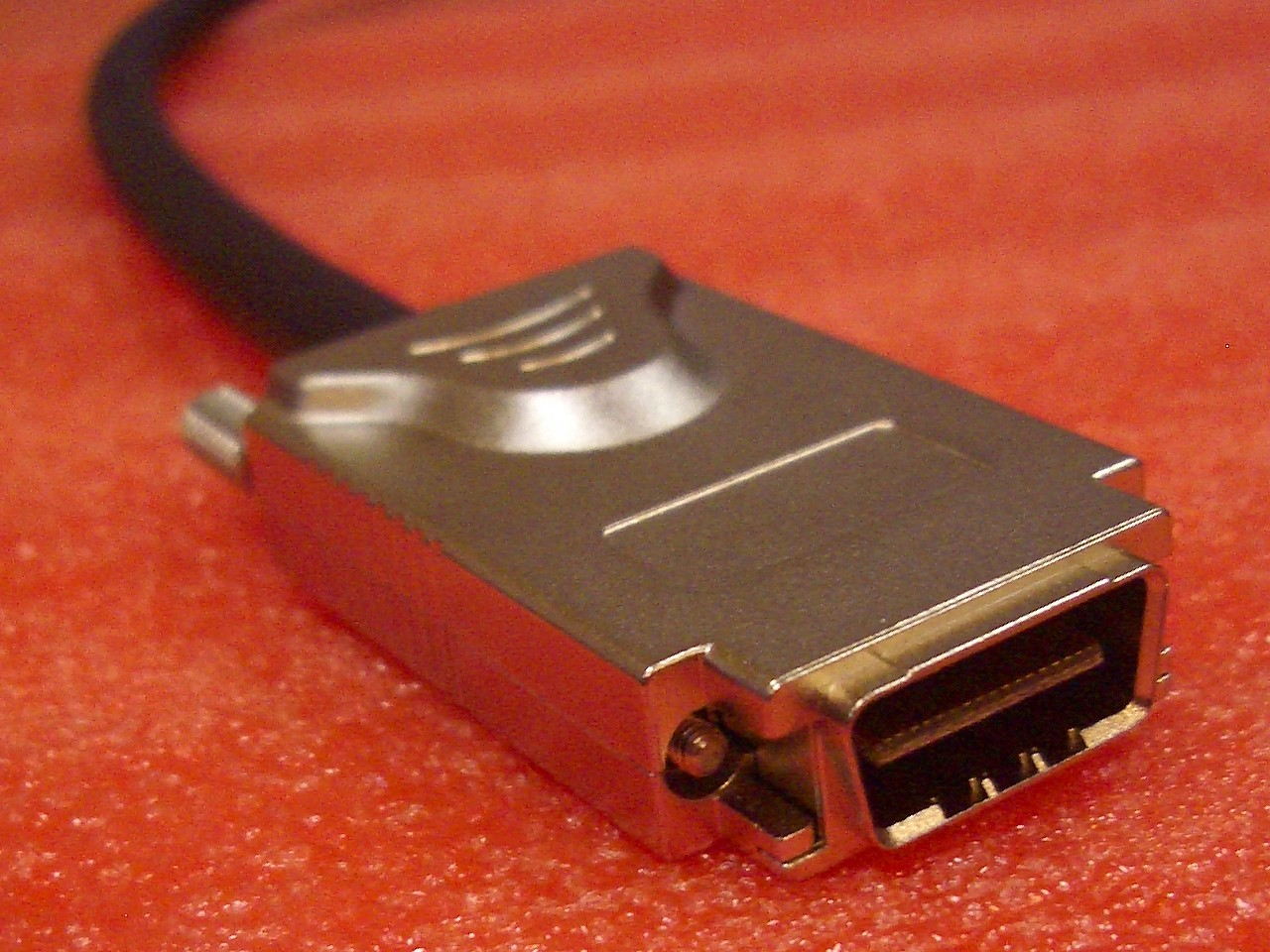
SFF-8470 connector

10GBASE-CX4 was the first 10 Gigabit copper standard published by 802.3 (as 802.3ak-2004). It uses the XAUI 4-lane PCS (Clause 48) and copper cabling similar to that used by InfiniBand technology with the same SFF-8470 connectors. It is specified to work up to a distance of 15 m (49 ft). Each lane carries 3.125 GBd of signaling bandwidth.

10GBASE-CX4 has been used for stacking switches. It offers the advantages of low power, low cost and low latency, but has a bigger form factor and more bulky cables than the newer single-lane SFP+ standard, and a much shorter reach than fiber or 10GBASE-T. This cable is fairly rigid and considerably more costly than Category 5/6 UTP or fiber.

10GBASE-CX4 applications are now commonly achieved using SFP+ Direct Attach and as of 2011, shipments of 10GBASE-CX4 have been very low.

=== SFP+ direct attach ===
Also known as direct attach (DA), direct attach copper (DAC), 10GSFP+Cu, sometimes also called 10GBASE-CR or 10GBASE-CX1, although there are no IEEE standards with either of the two latter names. Short direct attach cables use a passive twinaxial cabling assembly while longer ones add some extra range using electronic amplifiers. These DAC types connect directly into an SFP+ housing. SFP+ direct attach has a fixed-length cable, up to 15 m for copper cables. Like 10GBASE-CX4, DA is low-power, low-cost and low-latency with the added advantages of using less bulky cables and of having the small SFP+ form factor. SFP+ direct attach today is tremendously popular, with more ports installed than 10GBASE-SR.

=== Backplane ===
Backplane Ethernet, also known by the name of the task force that developed it, 802.3ap, is used in backplane applications such as blade servers and modular network equipment with upgradable line cards. 802.3ap implementations are required to operate over up to 1 metre (39 in) of copper printed circuit board with two connectors. The standard defines two port types for 10 Gbit/s (10GBASE-KX4 and 10GBASE-KR) and a single 1 Gbit/s port type (1000BASE-KX). It also defines an optional layer for forward error correction, a backplane autonegotiation protocol and link training for 10GBASE-KR where the receiver tunes a three-tap transmit equalizer. The autonegotiation protocol selects between 1000BASE-KX, 10GBASE-KX4, 10GBASE-KR or 40GBASE-KR4 operation. (Note: 40GBASE-KR4 is defined in 802.3ba.)

==== 10GBASE-KX4 ====
This operates over four backplane lanes and uses the same physical layer coding (defined in IEEE 802.3 Clause 48) as 10GBASE-CX4.

==== 10GBASE-KR ====
This operates over a single backplane lane and uses the same physical layer coding (defined in IEEE 802.3 Clause 49) as 10GBASE-LR/ER/SR. New backplane designs use 10GBASE-KR rather than 10GBASE-KX4.

=== 10GBASE-T ===
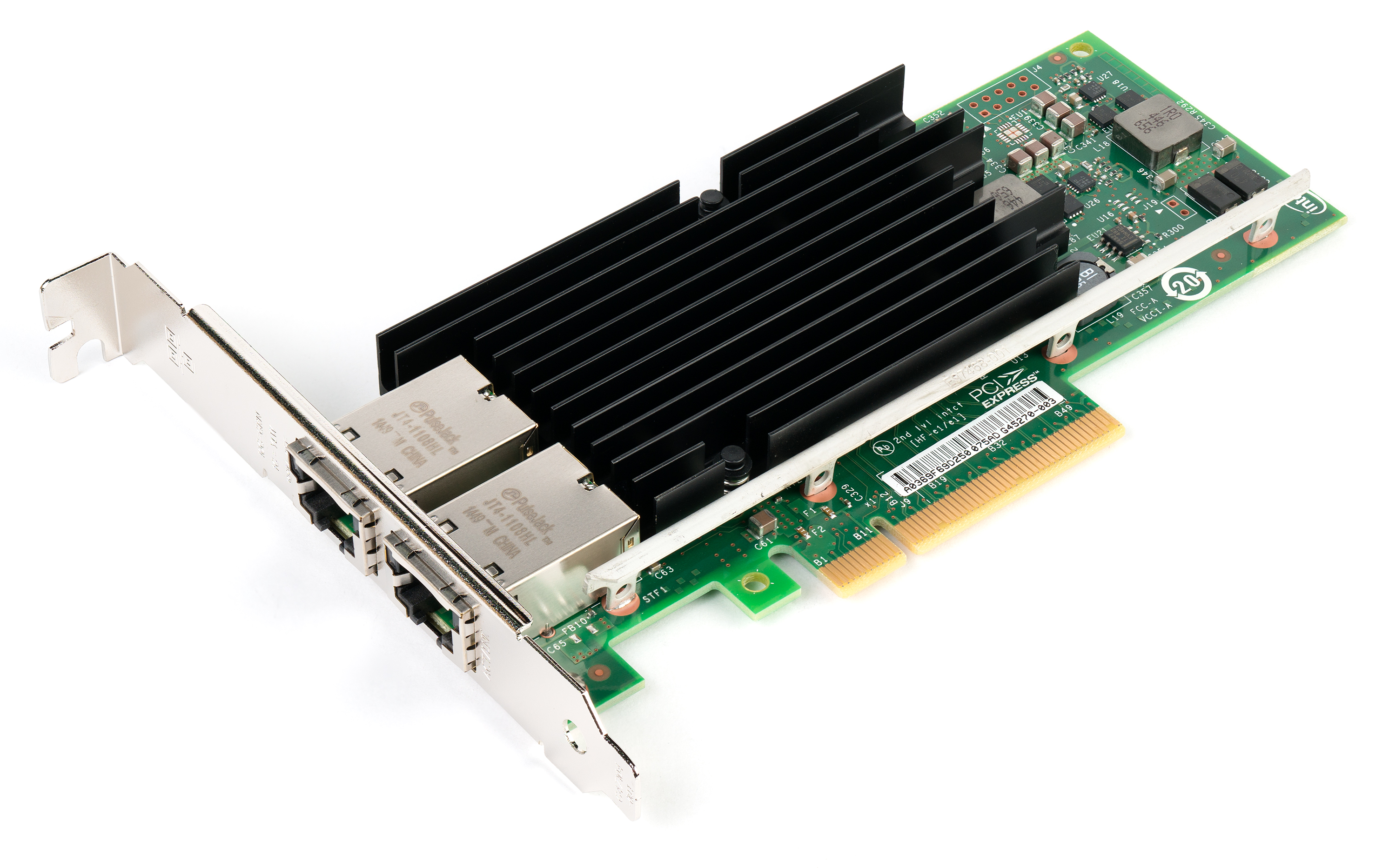
Intel X540-T2 10GBASE-T dual port NIC

10GBASE-T, or IEEE 802.3an-2006, is a standard released in 2006 to provide 10 Gbit/s connections over unshielded or shielded twisted pair cables, over distances up to 100 metres (330 ft). Category 6A is required to reach the full distance and category 5e or 6 may reach up to 55 metres (180 ft) depending on the quality of installation. 10GBASE-T cable infrastructure can also be used for 1000BASE-T allowing a gradual upgrade from 1000BASE-T using autonegotiation to select which speed is used. Due to additional line coding overhead, 10GBASE-T has a slightly higher latency (2 to 4 microseconds) in comparison to most other 10GBASE variants (1 microsecond or less). In comparison, 1000BASE-T latency is 1 to 12 microseconds (depending on packet size (Note: A maximum Gigabit Ethernet packet requires 12.2 μs for transfer (1526 × 8 ÷ 10^{9}) for store-and-forward; this adds to hardware latency.)).

10GBASE-T uses the IEC 60603-7 8P8C modular connectors already widely used with Ethernet. Transmission characteristics are now specified to 500 MHz. To reach this frequency Category 6A or better balanced twisted pair cables specified in ISO/IEC 11801 amendment 2 or ANSI/TIA-568-C.2 are needed to carry 10GBASE-T up to 100 m. Category 6 cables can carry 10GBASE-T for shorter distances when qualified according to the guidelines in ISO TR 24750 or TIA-155-A.

The 802.3an standard specifies the wire-level modulation for 10GBASE-T to use Tomlinson-Harashima precoding (THP) and pulse-amplitude modulation with 16 discrete levels (PAM-16), encoded in a two-dimensional checkerboard pattern known as DSQ128 sent on the line at 800 Msymbols/sec. Prior to precoding, forward error correction (FEC) coding is performed using a [2048,1723]_{2} low-density parity-check code on 1723 bits, with the parity check matrix construction based on a generalized Reed–Solomon [32,2,31] code over GF(2^{6}). Another 1536 bits are uncoded. Within each 1723+1536 block, there are 1+50+8+1 signaling and error detection bits and 3200 data bits (and occupy 320 ns on the line). In contrast, PAM-5 is the modulation technique used in 1000BASE-T Gigabit Ethernet. The line encoding used by 10GBASE-T is the basis for the newer and slower 2.5GBASE-T and 5GBASE-T standard, implementing a 2.5 or 5.0 Gbit/s connection over existing category 5e or 6 cabling. Cables that will not function reliably with 10GBASE-T may successfully operate with 2.5GBASE-T or 5GBASE-T if supported by both ends.

=== 10GBASE-T1 ===
10GBASE-T1 is for automotive applications and operates over a single balanced pair of conductors up to 15 m long, and is standardized in 802.3ch-2020.

== WAN PHY (10GBASE-W) ==
At the time that the 10 Gigabit Ethernet standard was developed, interest in 10GbE as a wide area network (WAN) transport led to the introduction of a WAN PHY for 10GbE. The WAN PHY was designed to interoperate with OC-192/STM-64 SDH/SONET equipment using a lightweight SDH/SONET frame running at 9.953 Gbit/s. The WAN PHY operates at a slightly slower data rate than the local area network (LAN) PHY. The WAN PHY can drive maximum link distances up to 80 km depending on the fiber standard employed.

The WAN PHY uses the same 10GBASE-S, 10GBASE-L and 10GBASE-E optical PMDs as the LAN PHYs and is designated as 10GBASE-SW, 10GBASE-LW or 10GBASE-EW. Its 64b/66b PCS is defined in IEEE 802.3 clause 49 and its PMD sublayers in clause 52. It also uses a WAN interface sublayer (WIS) defined in clause 50, which adds extra encapsulation to format the frame data to be compatible with SONET STS-192c.

== See also ==
- 10G
- Fiber-optic cable
- GG45
- List of interface bit rates
- Optical communication
- Parallel optical interface
- TERA
- XAUI
