= Transceiver =

Device that both transmits and receives

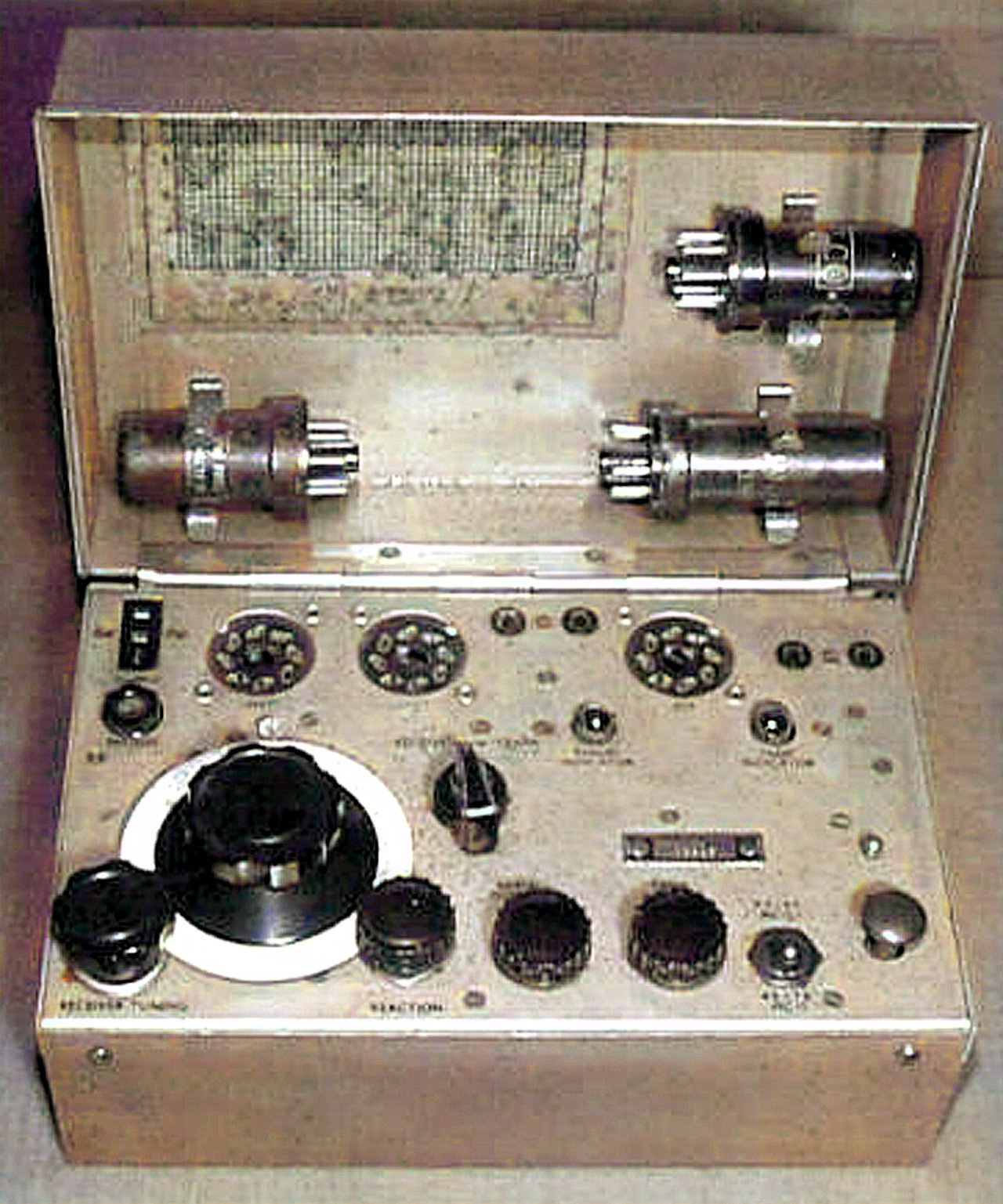
The Paraset is an example of a transceiver

In radio communication, a transceiver is an electronic device which is a combination of a radio transmitter and a receiver, hence the name. It can both transmit and receive radio waves using an antenna, for communication purposes. These two related functions are often combined in a single device to reduce manufacturing costs. The term is also used for other devices which can both transmit and receive through a communications channel, such as optical transceivers which transmit and receive light in optical fiber systems, and bus transceivers which transmit and receive digital data in computer data buses.

Radio transceivers are widely used in wireless devices. One large use is in two-way radios, which are audio transceivers used for bidirectional person-to-person voice communication. Examples are cell phones, which transmit and receive the two sides of a phone conversation using radio waves to a cell tower, cordless phones in which both the phone handset and the base station have transceivers to communicate both sides of the conversation, and land mobile radio systems like walkie-talkies and CB radios. Another large use is in wireless modems in mobile networked computer devices such laptops, pads, and cellphones, which both transmit digital data to and receive data from a wireless router. Aircraft carry automated microwave transceivers called transponders which, when they are triggered by microwaves from an air traffic control radar, transmit a coded signal back to the radar to identify the aircraft. Satellite transponders in communication satellites receive digital telecommunication data from a satellite ground station, and retransmit it to another ground station.

== History ==
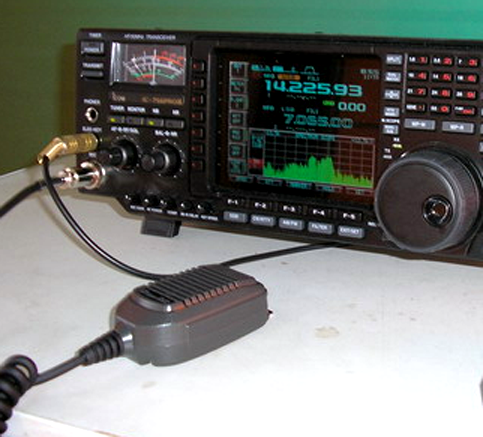
A modern HF transceiver with a spectrum analyzer and DSP capabilities

The transceiver first appeared in the 1920s. Before then, receivers and transmitters were manufactured separately and devices that wanted to receive and transmit data required both components. Almost all amateur radio equipment today uses transceivers, but there is an active market for pure radio receivers, which are mainly used by shortwave listening operators.

=== Analog ===
Analog transceivers use frequency modulation to send and receive data; however, any analog modulation scheme can be used (e.g. amplitude modulation or single-sideband modulation). Although this technique limits the complexity of the data that can be broadcast, analog transceivers operate very reliably and are used in many emergency communication systems. They are also cheaper than digital transceivers, which makes them popular with the CB and HAM radio communities.

=== Digital ===
Digital transceivers send and receive binary data over radio waves. This allows more types of data to be broadcast, including video and encrypted communication, which is commonly used by police and fire departments. Digital transmissions tend to be clearer and more detailed than their analog counterparts. Many modern wireless devices operate on digital transmissions.

== Usage ==
=== Telephony ===
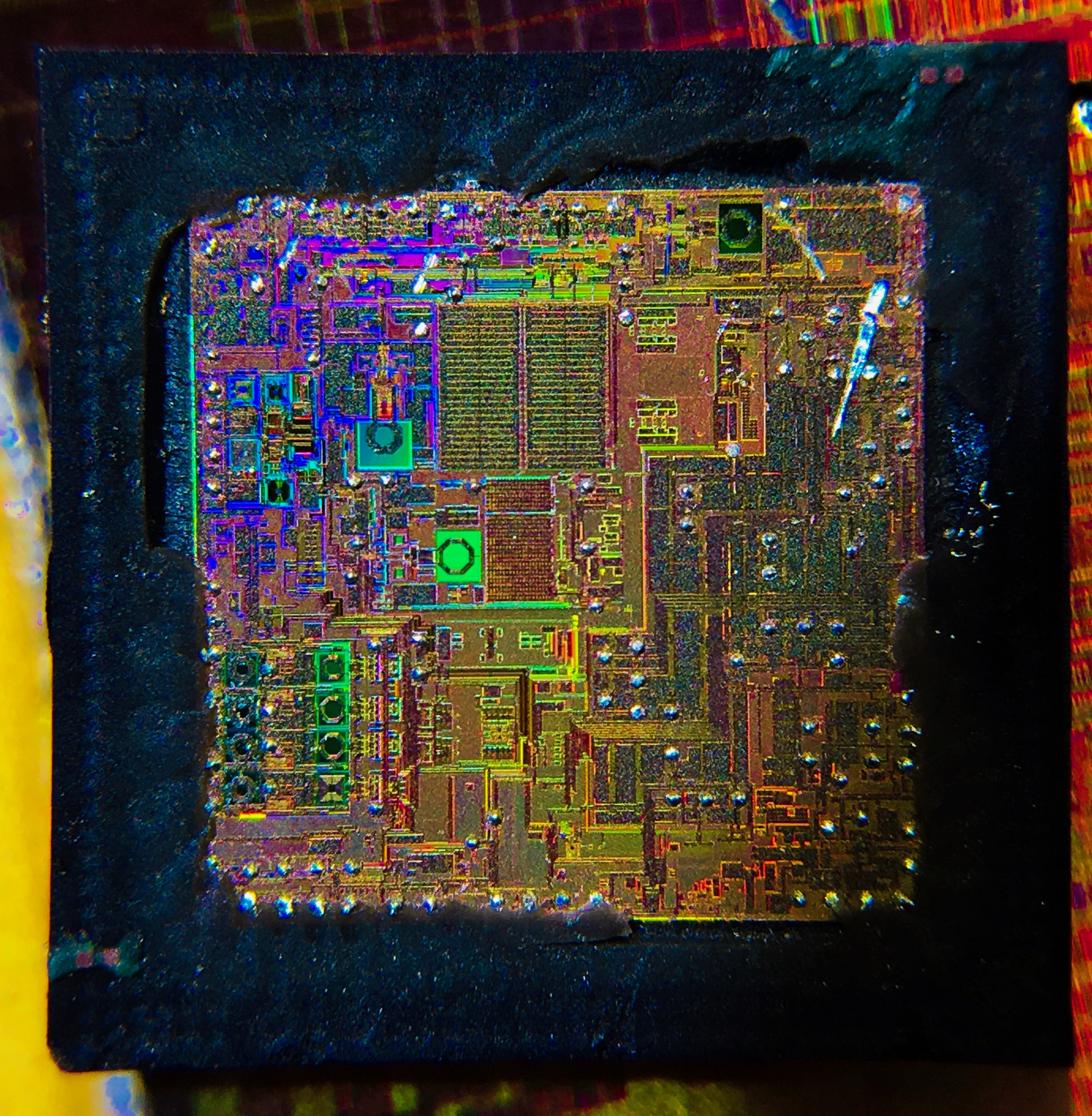
A decapped integrated circuit of a transceiver used in handheld communication devices and radio equipment as a modem extension. On-die passfilters are visible.

In a wired telephone, the handset contains the transmitter (for speaking) and receiver (for listening). Despite being able to transmit and receive data, the whole unit is colloquially referred to as a "receiver". On a mobile telephone or other radiotelephone, the entire unit is a transceiver for both audio and radio.

A cordless telephone uses an audio and radio transceiver for the handset, and a radio transceiver for the base station. If a speakerphone is included in a wired telephone base or in a cordless base station, the base also becomes an audio transceiver.

A modem is similar to a transceiver in that it sends and receives a signal, but a modem uses modulation and demodulation. It modulates the signal being transmitted and demodulates the signal being received.

=== Ethernet ===
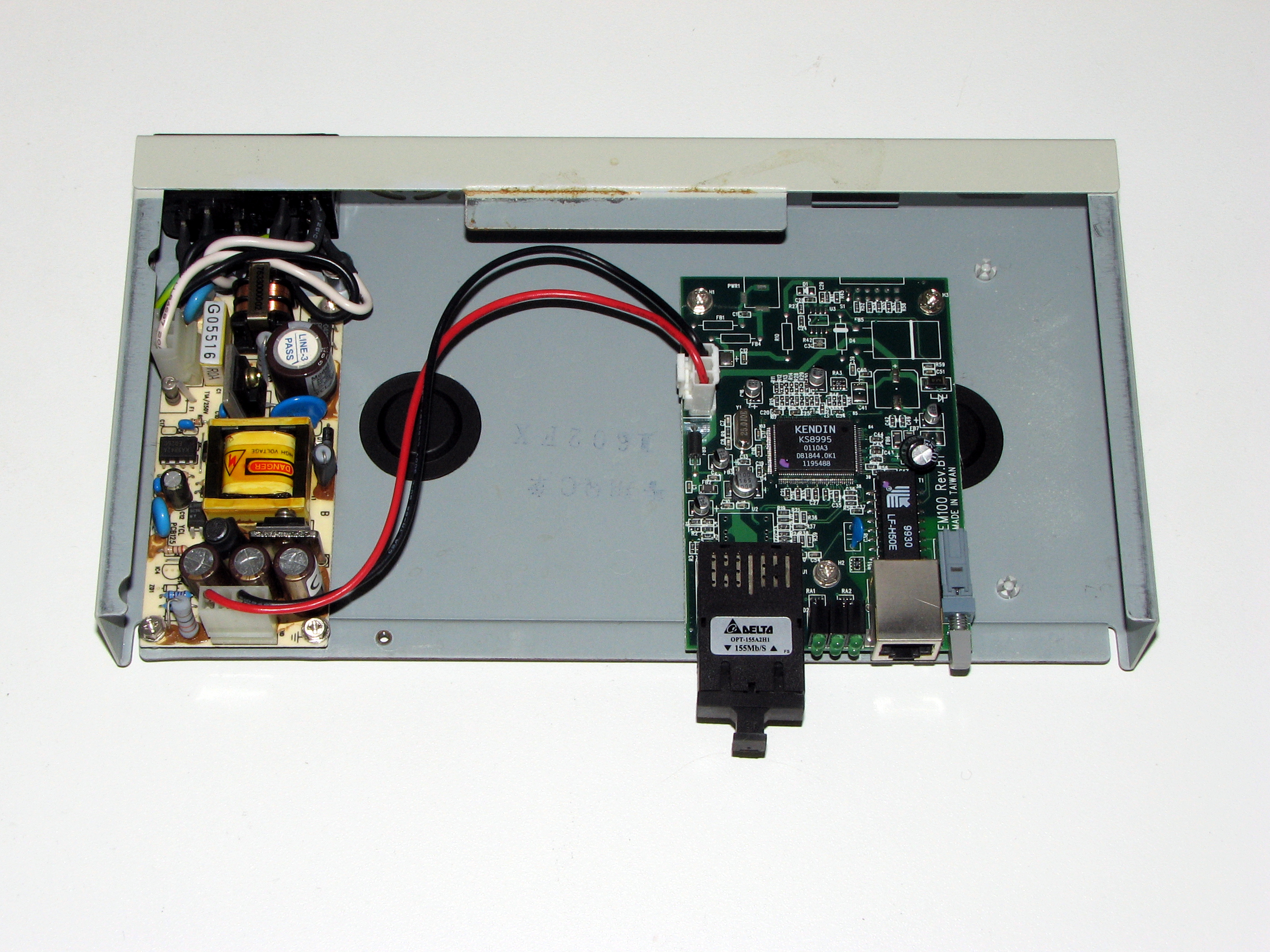
100BASE-TX connected to a 100BASE-FX transceiver

Transceivers are called Medium Attachment Units (MAUs) in IEEE 802.3 documents and were widely used in 10BASE2 and 10BASE5 Ethernet networks. Fiber-optic gigabit, 10 Gigabit Ethernet, 40 Gigabit Ethernet, and 100 Gigabit Ethernet utilize GBIC, SFP, SFP+, QSFP, XFP, XAUI, CXP, and CFP transceiver systems.

== Regulation ==
Because transceivers are capable of broadcasting information over airwaves, they are required to adhere to various regulations. In the United States, the Federal Communications Commission oversees their use. Transceivers must meet certain standards and capabilities depending on their intended use, and manufacturers must comply with these requirements. However, transceivers can be modified by users to violate FCC regulations. For instance, they might be used to broadcast on a frequency or channel that they should not have access to. For this reason, the FCC monitors not only the production but also the use of these devices.

== See also ==
- Two-way radio
- 4P4C, de facto standard connector for telephone handsets
- Duplex, two-way communications capability
- Paraset
- Radar beacon
- Transmitter
- Radio transmitter design
- Radio receiver
- Radio receiver design
- Transponder
