= Small Form-factor Pluggable =

Modular communications interface

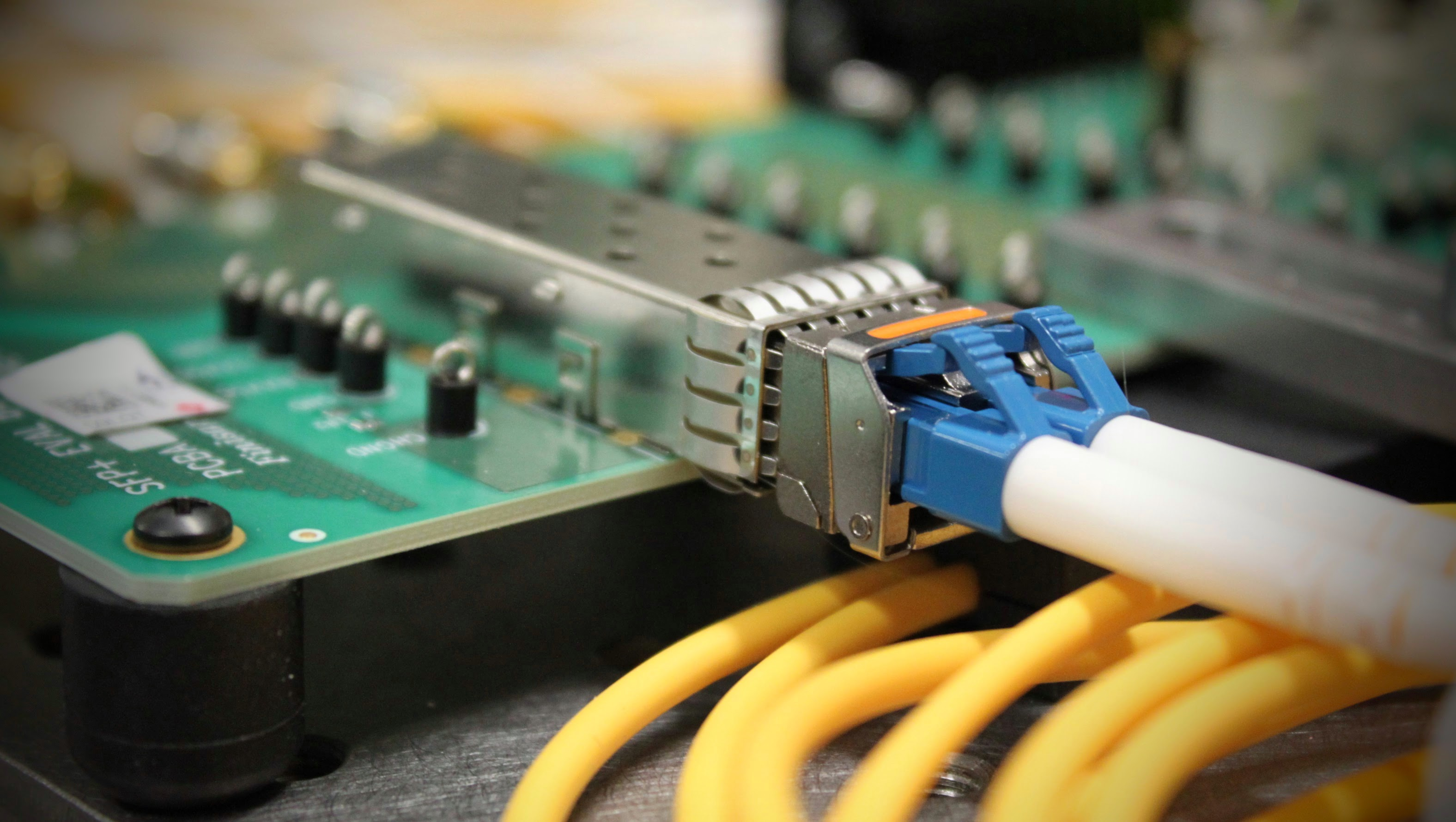
Small Form-factor Pluggable connected to a pair of fiber-optic cables

Small Form-factor Pluggable (SFP) is a compact, hot-pluggable network interface module format used for both telecommunication and data communications applications. An SFP interface on networking hardware is a modular slot for a media-specific transceiver, such as for a fiber-optic cable or a copper cable. The advantage of using SFPs compared to fixed interfaces (e.g. modular connectors in Ethernet switches) is that individual ports can be equipped with different types of transceivers as required, with the majority of devices including optical line terminals, network cards, switches and routers.

The form factor and electrical interface are specified by a multi-source agreement (MSA) under the auspices of the Small Form Factor Committee. The SFP replaced the larger gigabit interface converter (GBIC) in most applications, and has been referred to as a Mini-GBIC by some vendors.

SFP transceivers exist supporting synchronous optical networking (SONET), Gigabit Ethernet, Fibre Channel, PON, and other communications standards. At introduction, typical speeds were 1 Gbit/s for Ethernet SFPs and up to 4 Gbit/s for Fibre Channel SFP modules. In 2006, SFP+ specification brought speeds up to 10 Gbit/s and the later SFP28 iteration, introduced in 2014, is designed for speeds of 25 Gbit/s.

A slightly larger sibling is the four-lane Quad Small Form-factor Pluggable (QSFP). The additional lanes allow for speeds 4 times their corresponding SFP. In 2014, the QSFP28 variant was published allowing speeds up to 100 Gbit/s. In 2019, the closely related QSFP56 was standardized doubling the top speeds to 200 Gbit/s with products already selling from major vendors. There are inexpensive adapters allowing SFP transceivers to be placed in a QSFP port.

Both a SFP-DD, which allows for 100 Gbit/s over two lanes, as well as a QSFP-DD specifications, which allows for 400 Gbit/s over eight lanes, have been published. These use a form factor which is directly backward compatible to their respective predecessors.

An even larger sibling, the Octal Small Format Pluggable (OSFP), had products released in 2022 capable of 800 Gbit/s links between network equipment. It is slightly larger than the QSFP form factor, allowing for larger power outputs, and defines a 60-pin host interface. The OSFP standard was initially announced in 2016 with the 4.0 version released in 2021 allowing for 800 Gbit/s via 8×100 Gbit/s electrical data lanes. Its proponents say a low-cost adapter will allow for backwards compatibility with QSFP modules.

== SFP types ==
SFP transceivers are available with a variety of transmitter and receiver specifications, allowing users to select the appropriate transceiver for each link to provide the required optical or electrical reach over the available media type (e.g. twisted pair or twinaxial copper cables, multi-mode or single-mode fiber cables). Transceivers are also designated by their transmission speed. SFP modules are commonly available in several different categories.

Comparison of SFP types
Name	Nominal speed	Lanes	Pins	Standard	Introduced	Backward-compatible	PHY interface	Connector
SFP	100 Mbit/s	1	20	SFF INF-8074i	2001-05-01	None	MII	LC, SC, RJ45
SFP	1 Gbit/s	1	20	SFF INF-8074i	2001-05-01	100 Mbit/s SFP*	SGMII	LC, SC, RJ45
cSFP	1 Gbit/s	2						LC
SFP+	10 Gbit/s	1	20	SFF SFF-8431 4.1	2009-07-06	SFP	XGMII	LC, SC, RJ45
SFP28	25 Gbit/s	1	20	SFF SFF-8402	2014-09-13	SFP, SFP+		LC
SFP56	50 Gbit/s	1	20			SFP, SFP+, SFP28		LC
SFP-DD	100 Gbit/s	2	40	SFP-DD MSA	2018-01-26	SFP, SFP+, SFP28, SFP56		LC
SFP112	100 Gbit/s	1	20	SFP-DD MSA	2018-01-26	SFP, SFP+, SFP28, SFP56		LC
SFP-DD112	200 Gbit/s	2	40	SFP-DD MSA	2018-01-26	SFP, SFP+, SFP28, SFP56, SFP-DD, SFP112		LC
QSFP types
QSFP	4 Gbit/s	4	38	SFF INF-8438	2006-11-01	None	GMII	
QSFP+	40 Gbit/s	4	38	SFF SFF-8436	2012-04-01	None	XGMII	LC, MTP/MPO
QSFP28	50 Gbit/s	2	38	SFF SFF-8665	2014-09-13	QSFP+		LC
QSFP28	100 Gbit/s	4	38	SFF SFF-8665	2014-09-13	QSFP+		LC, MTP/MPO-12
QSFP56	200 Gbit/s	4	38	SFF SFF-8665	2015-06-29	QSFP+, QSFP28		LC, MTP/MPO-12
QSFP112	400 Gbit/s	4	38	SFF SFF-8665	2015-06-29	QSFP+, QSFP28, QSFP56		LC, MTP/MPO-12
QSFP-DD	400 Gbit/s	8	76	SFF INF-8628	2016-06-27	QSFP+, QSFP28, QSFP56		LC, MTP/MPO-16

Note that the QSFP, QSFP+, QSFP28 and QSFP56 are designed to be electrically backward compatible with SFP, SFP+, SFP28 or SFP56 respectively. Using a simple adapter or a special direct-attached cable, it is possible to connect those interfaces together using just one lane instead of the four provided by the QSFP, QSFP+, QSFP28 and QSFP56 form factors. The same applies to the QSFP-DD form factor with 8 lanes, which can work downgraded to 4, 2 or 1 lanes.

=== 100 Mbit/s SFP ===
- Multi-mode fiber, LC connector, with black or Beige color coding
  - SX – 850 nm, for a maximum of 550 m
- Multi-mode fiber, LC connector, with blue color coding
  - FX – 1300 nm, for a distance up to 5 km.
  - LFX (name dependent on manufacturer) – 1310 nm, for a distance up to 5 km.
- Single-mode fiber, LC connector, with blue color coding
  - LX – 1310 nm, for distances up to 10 km
  - EX – 1310 nm, for distances up to 40 km
- Single-mode fiber, LC connector, with green color coding
  - ZX – 1550 nm, for distances up to 80 km, (depending on fiber path loss)
  - EZX – 1550 nm, for distances up to 160 km (depending on fiber path loss)
- Single-mode fiber, LC connector, Bi-Directional, with blue and yellow color coding
  - BX (officially BX10) – 1550 nm/1310 nm, Single Fiber Bi-Directional 100 Mbit SFP Transceivers, paired as BX-U (blue) and BX-D (yellow) for uplink and downlink respectively, also for distances up to 10 km. Variations of bidirectional SFPs are also manufactured which higher transmit power versions with link length capabilities up to 40 km.
- Copper twisted-pair cabling, 8P8C (RJ-45) connector
  - 100BASE-TX – for distances up to 100m.

=== 1 Gbit/s SFP ===
- 1 to 1.25 Gbit/s multi-mode fiber, LC connector, with black or beige extraction lever
  - SX – 850 nm, for a maximum of 550 m at 1.25 Gbit/s (gigabit Ethernet). Other multi-mode SFP applications support even higher rates at shorter distances.
- 1 to 1.25 Gbit/s multi-mode fiber, LC connector, extraction lever colors not standardized
  - SX+/MX/LSX/LX (name dependent on manufacturer) – 1310 nm, for a distance up to 2 km. Not compatible with SX or 100BASE-FX. Based on LX but engineered to work with a multi-mode fiber using a standard multi-mode patch cable rather than a mode-conditioning cable commonly used to adapt LX to multi-mode.
- 1 to 2.5 Gbit/s single-mode fiber, LC connector, with blue extraction lever
  - LX – 1310 nm, for distances up to 10 km (originally, LX just covered 5 km and LX10 for 10 km followed later)
  - EX – 1310 nm, for distances up to 40 km
  - ZX – 1550 nm, for distances up to 80 km (depending on fiber path loss), with green extraction lever (see GLC-ZX-SM1)
  - EZX – 1550 nm, for distances up to 160 km (depending on fiber path loss)
  - BX (officially BX10) – 1490 nm/1310 nm, Single Fiber Bi-Directional Gigabit SFP Transceivers, paired as BX-U and BX-D for uplink and downlink respectively, also for distances up to 10 km. Variations of bidirectional SFPs are also manufactured which use 1550 nm in one direction, and higher transmit power versions with link length capabilities up to 80 km.
  - 1550 nm 40 km (XD), 80 km (ZX), 120 km (EX or EZX)
  - SFSW – single-fiber single-wavelength transceivers, for bi-directional traffic on a single fiber. Coupled with CWDM, these double the traffic density of fiber links.
  - Coarse wavelength-division multiplexing (CWDM) and dense wavelength-division multiplexing (DWDM) transceivers at various wavelengths achieve various maximum distances. CWDM and DWDM transceivers usually support link distances of 40, 80 and 120 km.
- 1 Gbit/s for copper twisted-pair cabling, 8P8C (RJ-45) connector
  - 1000BASE-T – these modules incorporate significant interface circuitry for Physical Coding Sublayer recoding and can be used only for gigabit Ethernet because of the specific line code. They are not compatible with (or rather: do not have equivalents for) Fibre Channel or SONET. Unlike most non-SFP, copper 1000BASE-T ports integrated into most routers and switches, 1000BASE-T SFPs usually cannot operate at 100BASE-TX speeds.
- 100 Mbit/s copper and optical – some vendors have shipped 100 Mbit/s limited SFPs for fiber-to-the-home applications and drop-in replacement of legacy 100BASE-FX circuits. These are relatively uncommon and can be easily confused with 100 Mbit/s SFPs.
- Although it is not mentioned in any official specification document the maximum data rate of the original SFP standard is 5 Gbit/s. This was eventually used by both 4GFC Fibre Channel and the DDR Infiniband especially in its four-lane QSFP form.
- In recent years, SFP transceivers have been created that will allow 2.5 Gbit/s and 5 Gbit/s Ethernet speeds with SFPs with 2.5GBASE-T and 5GBASE-T.

=== 10 Gbit/s SFP+ ===
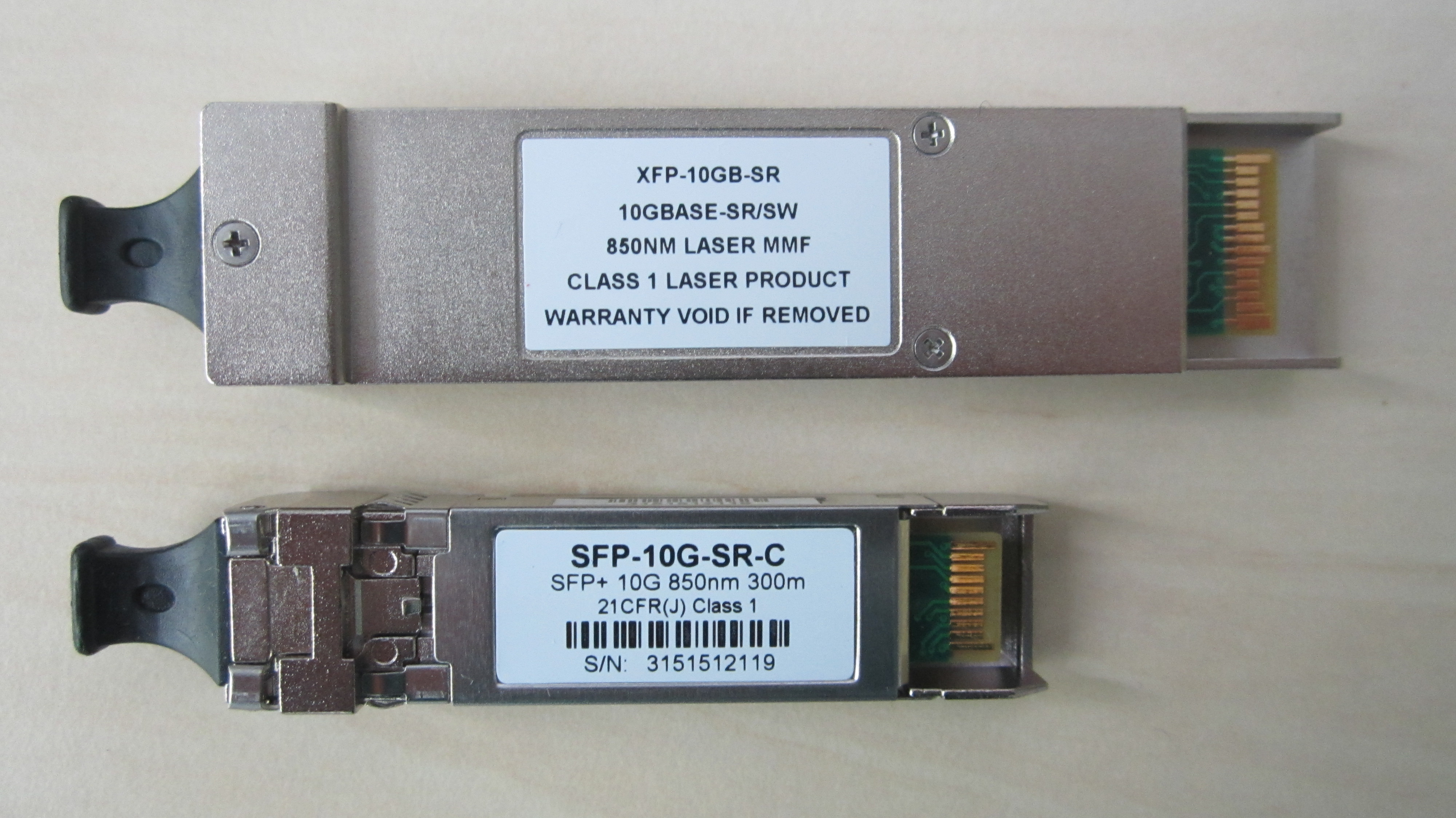
A 10 Gigabit Ethernet XFP transceiver, top, and a SFP+ transceiver, bottom

The SFP+ (enhanced small form-factor pluggable) is an enhanced version of the SFP that supports data rates up to 16 Gbit/s. The SFP+ specification was first published on May 9, 2006, and version 4.1 was published on July 6, 2009. SFP+ supports 8 Gbit/s Fibre Channel, 10 Gigabit Ethernet and Optical Transport Network standard OTU2. It is a popular industry format supported by many network component vendors. Although the SFP+ standard does not include mention of 16 Gbit/s Fibre Channel, it can be used at this speed. Besides the data rate, the major difference between 8 and 16 Gbit/s Fibre Channel is the encoding method. The 64b/66b encoding used for 16 Gbit/s is a more efficient encoding mechanism than 8b/10b used for 8 Gbit/s, and allows for the data rate to double without doubling the line rate. 16GFC doesn't really use 16 Gbit/s signaling anywhere. It uses a 14.025 Gbit/s line rate to achieve twice the throughput of 8GFC.

SFP+ also introduces direct attach for connecting two SFP+ ports without dedicated transceivers. Direct attach cables (DAC) exist in passive (up to 7 m), active (up to 15 m), and active optical (AOC, up to 100 m) variants.

10 Gbit/s SFP+ modules are exactly the same dimensions as regular SFPs, allowing the equipment manufacturer to re-use existing physical designs for 24 and 48-port switches and modular line cards. In comparison to earlier XENPAK or XFP modules, SFP+ modules leave more circuitry to be implemented on the host board instead of inside the module. Through the use of an active electronic adapter, SFP+ modules may be used in older equipment with XENPAK ports and X2 ports.

SFP+ modules can be described as limiting or linear types; this describes the functionality of the inbuilt electronics. Limiting SFP+ modules include a signal amplifier to re-shape the (degraded) received signal whereas linear ones do not. Linear modules are mainly used with the low bandwidth standards such as 10GBASE-LRM; otherwise, limiting modules are preferred.

=== 25 Gbit/s SFP28 ===
SFP28 is a 25 Gbit/s interface which evolved from the 100 Gigabit Ethernet interface which is typically implemented with 4 by 25 Gbit/s data lanes. Identical in mechanical dimensions to SFP and SFP+, SFP28 implements one 28 Gbit/s lane accommodating 25 Gbit/s of data with encoding overhead.

SFP28 modules exist supporting single- or multi-mode fiber connections, active optical cable and direct attach copper.

=== cSFP ===
The compact small form-factor pluggable (cSFP) is a version of SFP with the same mechanical form factor allowing two independent bidirectional channels per port. It is used primarily to increase port density and decrease fiber usage per port.

=== SFP-DD ===
The small form-factor pluggable double density (SFP-DD) multi-source agreement is a standard published in 2019 for doubling port density. According to the SFD-DD MSA website: "Network equipment based on the SFP-DD will support legacy SFP modules and cables, and new double density products." SFP-DD uses two lanes to transmit.

Currently, the following speeds are defined:

- SFP112: 100 Gbit/s using PAM4 on a single pair (not double density)
- SFP-DD: 100 Gbit/s using PAM4 and 50 Gbit/s using NRZ
- SFP-DD112: 200 Gbit/s using PAM4
- QSFP112: 400 Gbit/s (4 × 112 Gbit/s)
- QSFP-DD: 400 Gbit/s/200 Gbit/s (8 × 50 Gbit/s and 8 × 25 Gbit/s)
- QSFP-DD800 (formerly QSFP-DD112): 800 Gbit/s (8 × 112 Gbit/s)
- QSFP-DD1600 (Draft) 1.6 Tbit/s

== QSFP ==
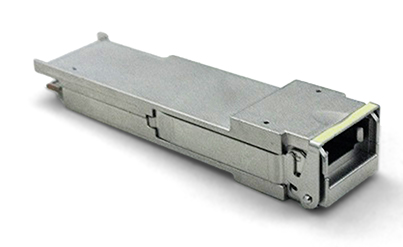
QSFP+ 40 Gb transceiver

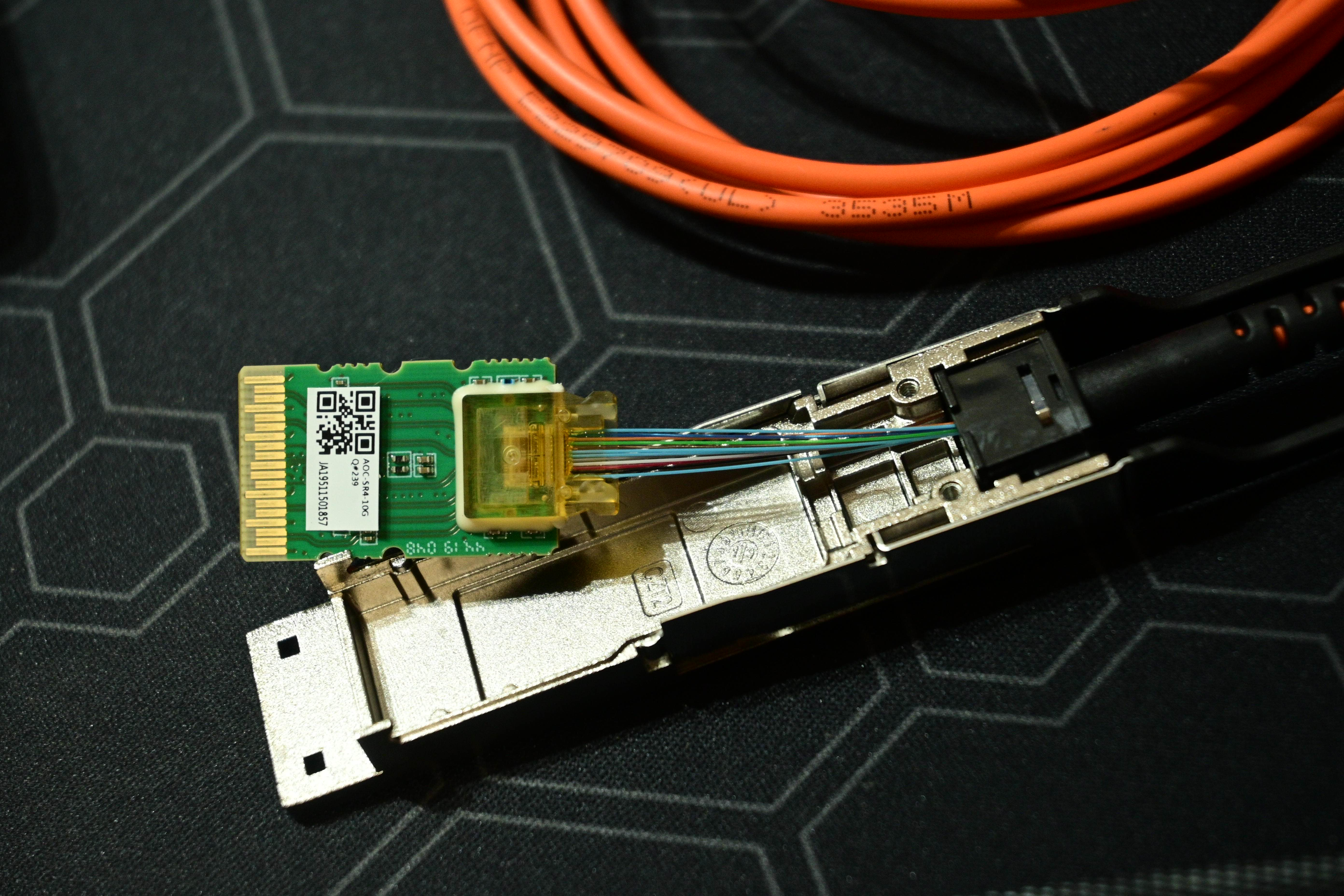
40 Gbit QSFP+ transceiver showing the optical fibre connection

Quad Small Form-factor Pluggable (QSFP) transceivers are available with a variety of transmitter and receiver types, allowing users to select the appropriate transceiver for each link to provide the required optical reach over multi-mode or single-mode fiber.

4 Gbit/s
The original QSFP document specified four channels carrying Gigabit Ethernet, 4GFC (FiberChannel), or DDR InfiniBand.
40 Gbit/s (QSFP+)
QSFP+ is an evolution of QSFP to support four 10 Gbit/s channels carrying 10 Gigabit Ethernet, 10GFC FiberChannel, or QDR InfiniBand. The 4 channels can also be combined into a single 40 Gigabit Ethernet link.
50 Gbit/s (QSFP14)
The QSFP14 standard is designed to carry FDR InfiniBand, SAS-3 or 16G Fibre Channel.
100 Gbit/s (QSFP28)
The QSFP28 standard is designed to carry 100 Gigabit Ethernet, EDR InfiniBand, or 32G Fibre Channel. Sometimes this transceiver type is also referred to as QSFP100 or 100G QSFP for sake of simplicity.
200 Gbit/s (QSFP56)
QSFP56 is designed to carry 200 Gigabit Ethernet, HDR InfiniBand, or 64G Fibre Channel. The biggest enhancement is that QSFP56 uses four-level pulse-amplitude modulation (PAM-4) instead of non-return-to-zero (NRZ). It uses the same physical specifications as QSFP28 (SFF-8665), with electrical specifications from SFF-8024 and revision 2.10a of SFF-8636. Sometimes this transceiver type is referred to as 200G QSFP for sake of simplicity.
400 Gbit/s (QSFP56-DD)
QSFP56-DD (frequently called QSFP-DD) is designed to carry 400 Gigabit Ethernet or GDR InfiniBand. The biggest enhancement is that QSFP56-DD uses eight electrical channels (double that of QSFP56, thus the -DD "double density" notation). Physical specifications are in SFF-8677 while electrical specifications are in SFF-8679.

Switch and router manufacturers implementing QSFP+ ports in their products frequently allow for the use of a single QSFP+ port as four independent 10 Gigabit Ethernet connections, greatly increasing port density. For example, a typical 24-port QSFP+ 1U switch would be able to service 96x10GbE connections. There also exist fanout cables to adapt a single QSFP28 port to four independent 25 Gigabit Ethernet SFP28 ports (QSFP28-to-4×SFP28) as well as cables to adapt a single QSFP56 port to four independent 50 Gigabit Ethernet SFP56 ports (QSFP56-to-4×SFP56).

== Applications ==
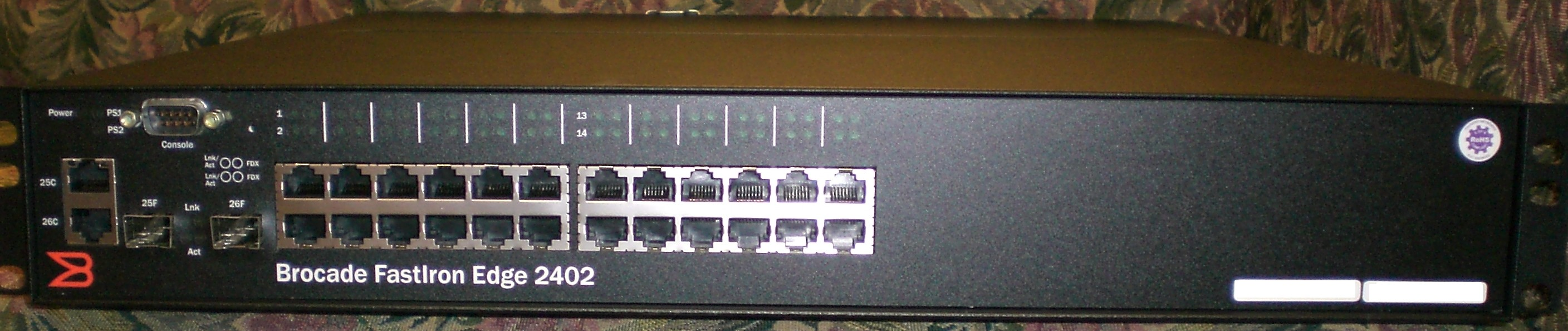
Ethernet switch with two empty SFP slots (lower left)

SFP sockets are found in Ethernet switches, routers, firewalls and network interface cards. They are used in Fibre Channel host adapters and storage equipment. Because of their low cost, low profile, and ability to provide a connection to different types of optical fiber, SFPs provide such equipment with enhanced flexibility.

SFP sockets and transceivers are also used for long-distance serial digital interface (SDI) transmission.

== Standardization ==
The SFP transceiver is not standardized by any official standards body, but rather is specified by a multi-source agreement (MSA) among competing manufacturers. The SFP was designed after the GBIC interface and allows greater port density (number of transceivers per given area) than the GBIC, which is why SFP is also known as mini-GBIC.

However, as a practical matter, some networking equipment manufacturers engage in vendor lock-in practices whereby they deliberately break compatibility with generic SFPs by adding a check in the device's firmware that will enable only the vendor's own modules. Third-party SFP manufacturers have introduced SFPs with EEPROMs which may be programmed to match any vendor ID. Known vendors locking in their SFP ports include HPE and Cisco.

== Color coding of SFP ==
=== Color coding of SFP ===
Color	Standard	Media	Wavelength	Notes
Black	INF-8074	Multimode	850 nm	
Beige	INF-8074	Multimode	850 nm	
Black	INF-8074	Multimode	1300 nm	
Blue	INF-8074	Singlemode	1310 nm	
Red	proprietary (non SFF)	Singlemode	1310 nm	Used on 25GBASE-ER
Green	proprietary (non SFF)	Singlemode	1550 nm	Used on 100BASE-ZE
Red	proprietary (non SFF)	Singlemode	1550 nm	Used on 10GBASE-ER
White	proprietary (non SFF)	Singlemode	1550 nm	Used on 10GBASE-ZR

=== Color coding of CWDM SFP ===
See also: coarse wavelength-division multiplexing

Color	Standard	Wavelength	Notes
Grey		1270 nm	
Grey		1290 nm	
Grey		1310 nm	
Violet		1330 nm	
Blue		1350 nm	
Green		1370 nm	
Yellow		1390 nm	
Orange		1410 nm	
Red		1430 nm	
Brown		1450 nm	
Grey		1470 nm	
Violet		1490 nm	
Blue		1510 nm	
Green		1530 nm	
Yellow		1550 nm	
Orange		1570 nm	
Red		1590 nm	
Brown		1610 nm	

=== Color coding of BiDi SFP ===
Name	Standard	Side A Color TX	Side A wavelength TX	Side B Color TX	Side B wavelength TX	Notes
1000BASE-BX		Blue	1310 nm	Purple	1490 nm	
1000BASE-BX		Blue	1310 nm	Yellow	1550 nm	
10GBASE-BX; 25GBASE-BX		Blue	1270 nm	Red	1330 nm	
10GBASE-BX		White	1490 nm	White	1550 nm	

=== Color coding of QSFP ===
Color	Standard	Wavelength	Multiplexing	Notes
Beige	INF-8438	850 nm	No	
Blue	INF-8438	1310 nm	No	
White	INF-8438	1550 nm	No	

== Signals ==
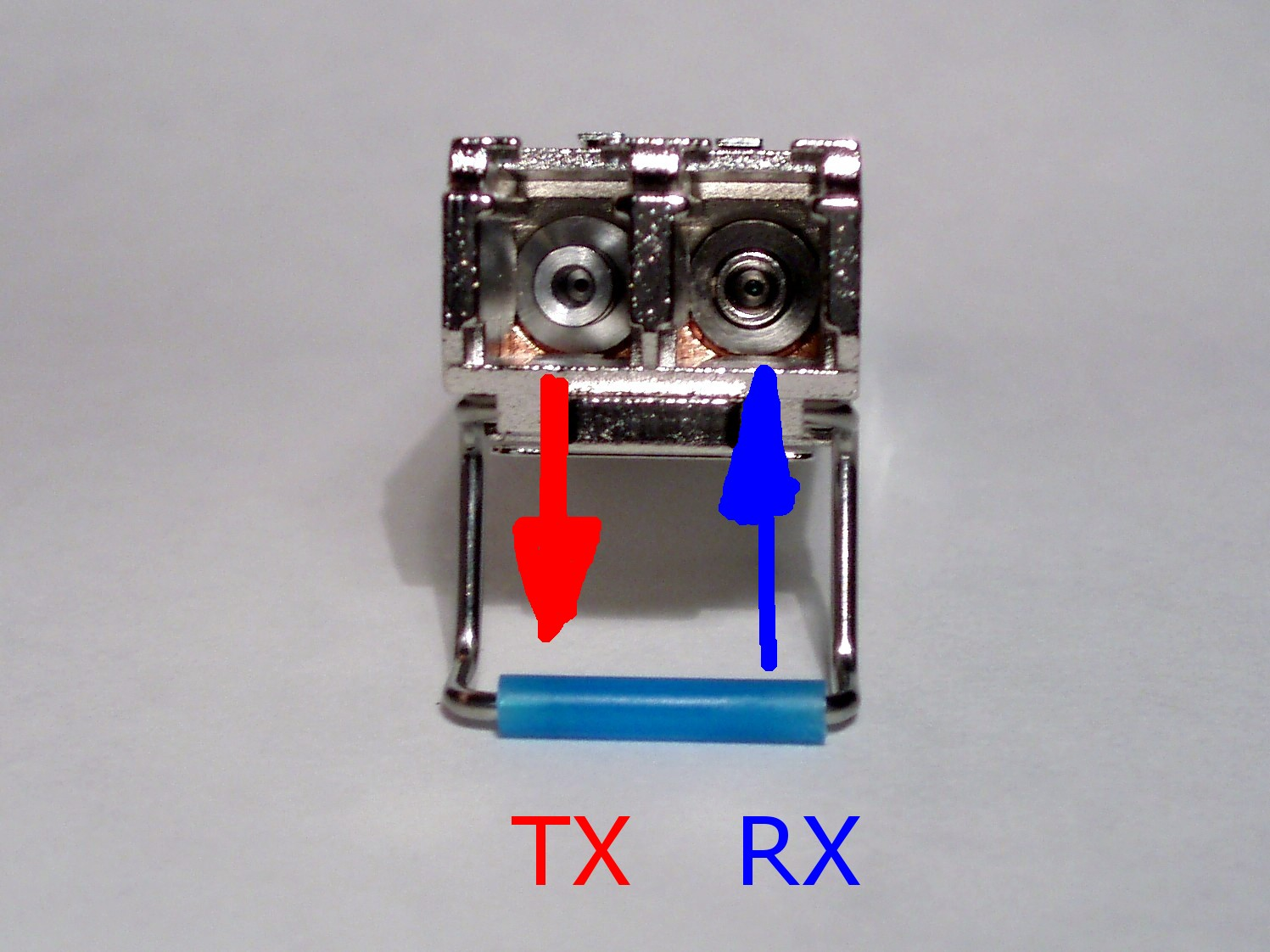
Front view of SFP module with integrated LC connector indicating transmission direction of the two optical connectors

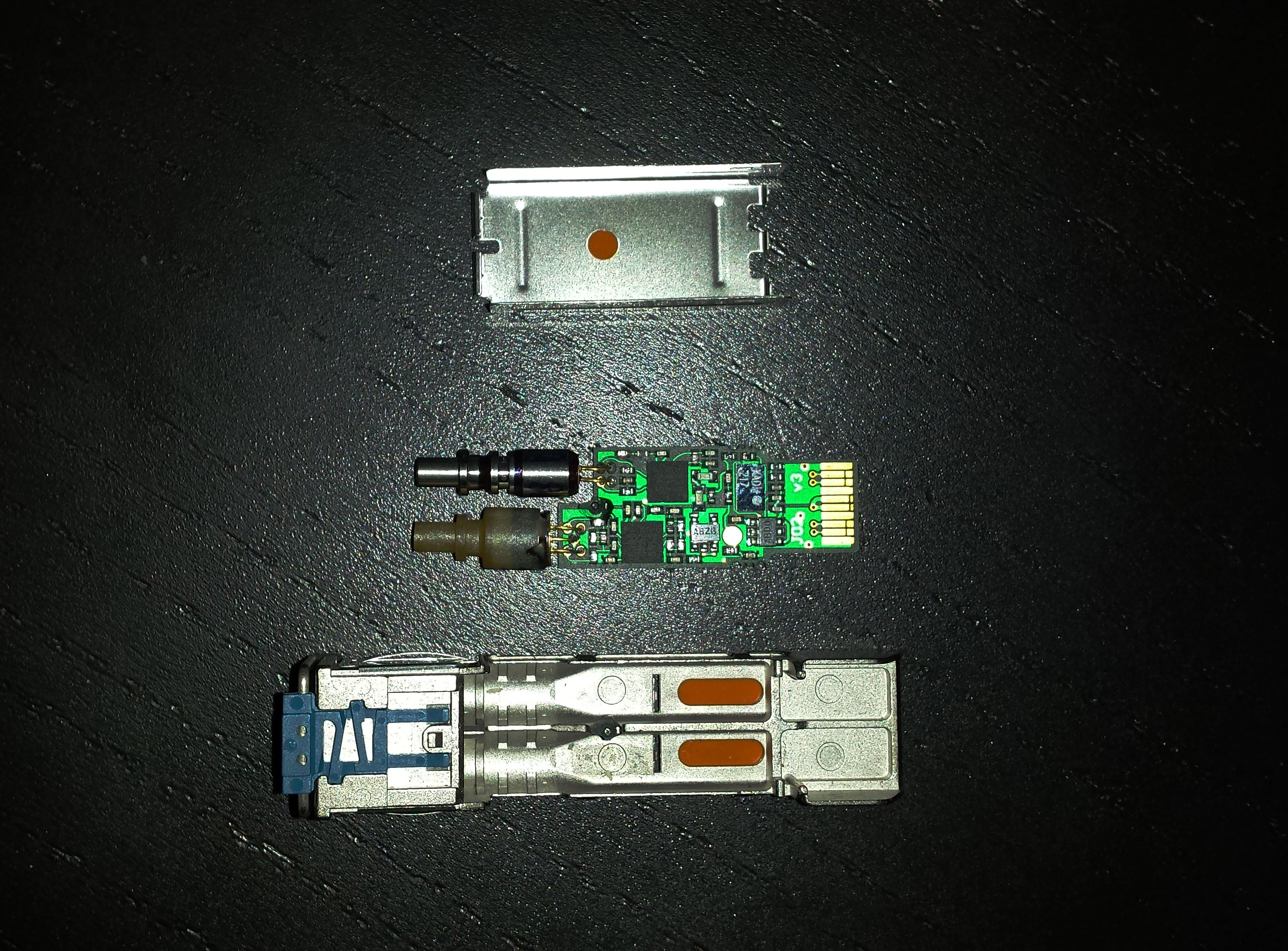
Disassembled OC-3 SFP. The top, metal canister is the transmitting laser diode, the bottom, plastic canister is the receiving photo diode.

When looking into the optical connectors, the one on the left is the transmitter and the one on the right is the receiver.

The SFP transceiver contains a printed circuit board with an edge connector with 20 pads that mate on the rear with the SFP electrical connector in the host system. The QSFP has 38 pads including 4 high-speed transmit data pairs and 4 high-speed receive data pairs.

SFP electrical pin-out
Pad	Name	Function
1	VeeT	Transmitter ground
2	Tx_Fault	Transmitter fault indication
3	Tx_Disable	Optical output disabled when high
4	SDA	2-wire serial interface data line (using the CMOS EEPROM protocol defined for the ATMEL AT24C01A/02/04 family)
5	SCL	2-wire serial interface clock
6	Mod_ABS	Module absent, connection to VeeT or VeeR in the module indicates module presence to host
7	RS0	Rate select 0
8	Rx_LOS	Receiver loss of signal indication
9	RS1	Rate select 1
10	VeeR	Receiver ground
11	VeeR	Receiver ground
12	RD-	Inverted received data
13	RD+	Received data
14	VeeR	Receiver ground
15	VccR	Receiver power (3.3 V, max. 300 mA)
16	VccT	Transmitter power (3.3 V, max. 300 mA)
17	VeeT	Transmitter ground
18	TD+	Transmit data
19	TD-	Inverted transmit data
20	VeeT	Transmitter ground

QSFP electrical pin-out
Pad	Name	Function
1	GND	Ground
2	Tx2n	Transmitter inverted data input
3	Tx2p	Transmitter non-inverted data input
4	GND	Ground
5	Tx4n	Transmitter inverted data input
6	Tx4p	Transmitter non-inverted data input
7	GND	Ground
8	ModSelL	Module select
9	ResetL	Module reset
10	Vcc-Rx	+3.3 V receiver power supply
11	SCL	Two-wire serial interface clock
12	SDA	Two-wire serial interface data
13	GND	Ground
14	Rx3p	Receiver non-inverted data output
15	Rx3n	Receiver inverted data output
16	GND	Ground
17	Rx1p	Receiver non-inverted data output
18	Rx1n	Receiver inverted data output
19	GND	Ground
20	GND	Ground
21	Rx2n	Receiver inverted data output
22	Rx2p	Receiver non-inverted data output
23	GND	Ground
24	Rx4n	Receiver inverted data output
25	Rx4p	Receiver non-inverted data output
26	GND	Ground
27	ModPrsL	Module present
28	IntL	Interrupt
29	Vcc-Tx	+3.3 V transmitter power supply
30	Vcc1	+3.3 V power supply
31	LPMode	Low power mode
32	GND	Ground
33	Tx3p	Transmitter non-inverted data input
34	Tx3n	Transmitter inverted data input
35	GND	Ground
36	Tx1p	Transmitter non-inverted data input
37	Tx1n	Transmitter inverted data input
38	GND	Ground

== Mechanical dimensions ==
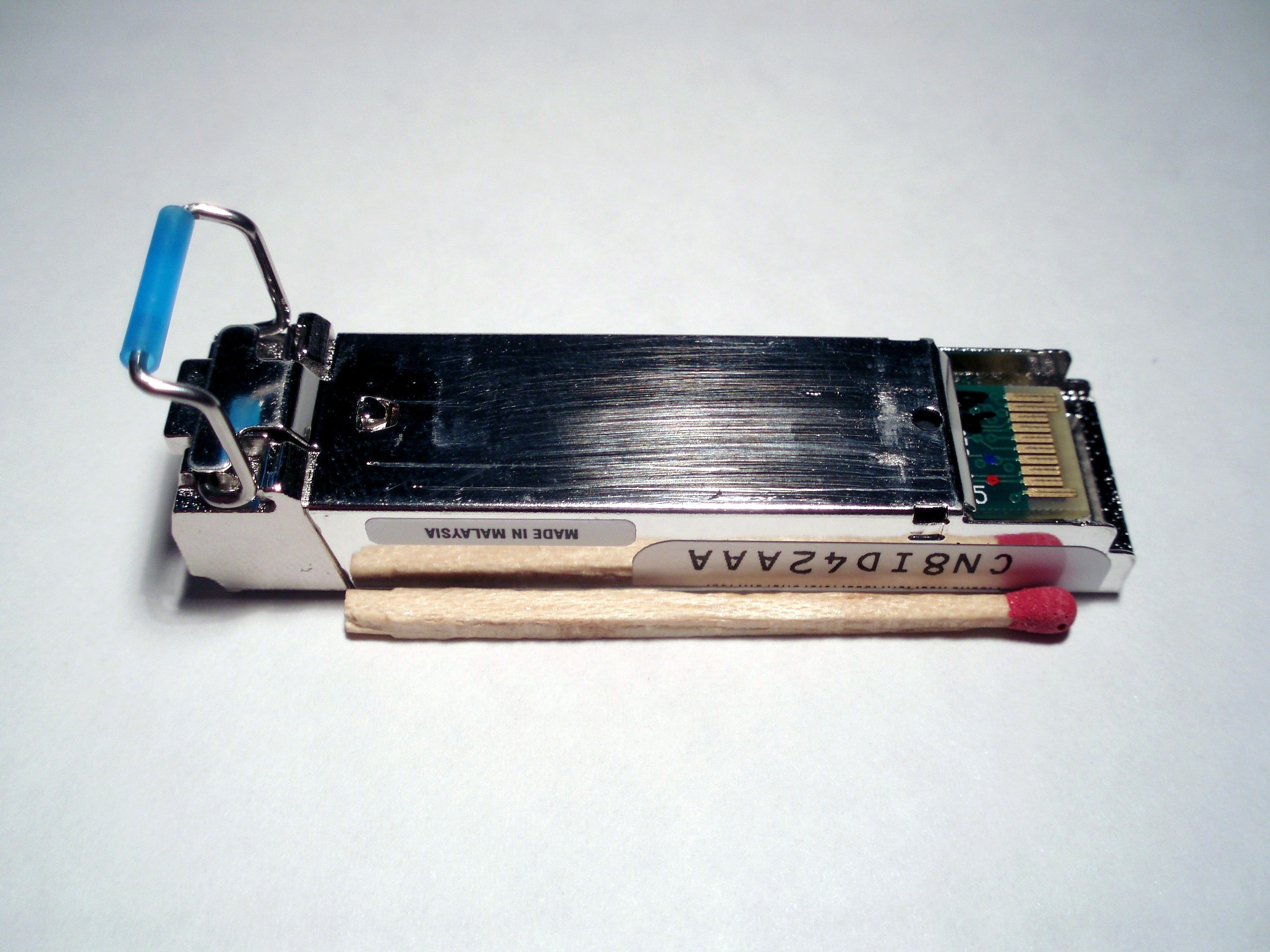
Side view of SFP module. Depth, the longest dimension, is 56.5 mm (2.22 in).

The physical dimensions of the SFP transceiver (and its subsequent faster variants) are narrower than the later QSFP counterparts, which allows for SFP transceivers to be placed in QSFP ports via an inexpensive adapter. Both are smaller than the XFP transceiver.

SFP modules that use SC fiber connectors don't always indicate whether they use SC/APC (angled) or SC/UPC (ultra polished) connections. SC/UPC is the most common.

Dimensions
	SFP		QSFP		XFP	
	mm	in	mm	in	mm	in
Height	8.5	0.33	8.5	0.33	8.5	0.33
Width	13.4	0.53	18.35	0.722	18.35	0.722
Depth	56.5	2.22	72.4	2.85	78.0	3.07

== EEPROM information and Management Interface ==
The SFP MSA defines a 256-byte memory map into an EEPROM describing the transceiver's capabilities, standard interfaces, manufacturer, and other information, which is accessible over a serial I²C interface at the 8-bit address 0b1010000X (0xA0).

Later standards also specify (volatile) memory locations that offer the ability to observe and change the behavior of the transceiver.

Management interface standards
Form factor	Management interface standard
SFP+	SFF-8472
QSFP+	SFF-8636

== Digital diagnostics monitoring ==
Modern optical SFP transceivers support standard digital diagnostics monitoring (DDM) functions. This feature is also known as digital optical monitoring (DOM). This capability allows monitoring of the SFP operating parameters in real time. Parameters include optical output power, optical input power, temperature, laser bias current, and transceiver supply voltage. In network equipment, this information is typically made available via Simple Network Management Protocol (SNMP). A DDM interface allows end users to display diagnostics data and alarms for optical fiber transceivers and can be used to diagnose why a transceiver is not working.

Even if some DDM readings often are presented with two decimals, the MSA allows for a variation of +/- 3 dB in the optical Tx and Rx readings. Similarly, TX bias current accuracy is mandated to be better than +/-15%, transceiver temperature +/- 3 ºC and voltage +/- 3%.

== See also ==
- Interconnect bottleneck
- Optical communication
- Parallel optical interface
- C form-factor pluggable
