= X2 transceiver =

The X2 transceiver format is a 10 gigabit per second modular fiber optic interface intended for use in routers, switches and optical transport platforms. It is an early generation 10 gigabit interface related to the similar XENPAK and XPAK formats. X2 may be used with 10 Gigabit Ethernet or OC-192/STM-64 speed SDH/SONET equipment.

X2 modules are smaller and consume less power than first-generation XENPAK modules, but larger and consume more energy than the newer XFP transceiver standard and SFP+ standards.

As of 2016 this format is relatively uncommon and has been replaced by 10 Gbit/s SFP+ in most new equipment.
