= 10G =

Internet service marketing term

10G is a term used by some cable Internet access providers and industry groups in the United States in reference to broadband networks with a maximum potential download rate of ten gigabits per second (10 Gbit/s). The term was first used in this regard by industry association NCTA in January 2019, which said it had filed for a trademark on the term, and expanded on by CableLabs in a summer 2019 white paper.

The term "10G" has no connection to the numbered generations of cellular network standards such as 5G (fifth generation). Some articles discussing the term have posited that 10G suggests to casual readers that service would be twice as fast as 5G, when in fact the 5G standard already encompasses even faster speeds of up to 20 Gbit/s.

In 2023, after introducing symmetric, 10-gigabit service using DOCSIS 4.0 for selected business customers, Comcast began referring to its Xfinity Internet service as "the Xfinity 10G network", despite the fact that the top-speed service available in the vast majority of homes served by Comcast was still only 1 Gbit/s.

In October 2023, the National Advertising Division (NAD) of the Better Business Bureau ruled that it considered Comcast's use of the "Xfinity 10G Network" branding to be false or misleading, as it constituted an express claim that Comcast was using a tenth-generation network or was promising 10 Gbit/s speeds to all customers. The NAD recommended that Comcast should either discontinue its claims or clarify 10G as an "aspirational" technology. Comcast said it would appeal the decision by the self-regulatory body. However, by January 2024, Comcast said it would no longer use the "10G Network" branding in marketing.

== See also ==
- 10 Gigabit Ethernet – a set of technologies for Ethernet communications that support up to 10 Gbit/s speeds
- 10G-PON and 10G-EPON – passive optical network standards that support up to 10 Gbit/s speeds
