= Multi-source agreement =

Agreement among manufacturers to make compatible products

In the telecommunications industry, a multi-source agreement (MSA) is an agreement among multiple manufacturers to make products which are compatible across vendors, acting as de facto standards, establishing a competitive market for interoperable products.

Products that adhere to multi-source agreements (MSAs) include: optical transceivers, such as the SFP, SFP+, XENPAK, QSFP, XFP, CFP etc.; fiber optic cables; and other networking devices. MSAs strictly define the operating characteristics of these network devices so that system vendors may implement ports in their devices (e.g. Ethernet switches and routers) that allow MSA compliant devices produced by name brands, as well as third party vendors, to function properly.
