= Fiber-optic patch cord =

Short fiber-optic cable with connectors at either end

A fiber-optic patch cord is a fiber-optic cable capped at each end with connectors that allow it to be rapidly and conveniently connected to telecommunication equipment. This is known as interconnect-style cabling.

== General characteristics ==
=== Construction ===
A fiber-optic patch cord is constructed from a core with a high refractive index, surrounded by a coating with a low refractive index, that is strengthened by aramid yarns and surrounded by a protective jacket. Transparency of the core permits transmission of optic signals with little loss over great distances. The coating's lower refractive index causes light to be reflected back toward the core, minimizing signal loss. The protective aramid yarns and outer jacket minimize physical damage to the core and coating.

=== Size ===
Ordinary fibers measure 125 μm in diameter (a strand of human hair is about 100 μm). The inner diameter measures 9 μm for single-mode cables, and 50 / 62.5 μm for multi-mode cables.

The development of "reduced bend radius" fiber in the mid-2000s, enabled a trend towards smaller cables. Each unit of diameter reduction in a round cable, produces a disproportionate corresponding reduction in the space the cable occupies.

== Classification ==
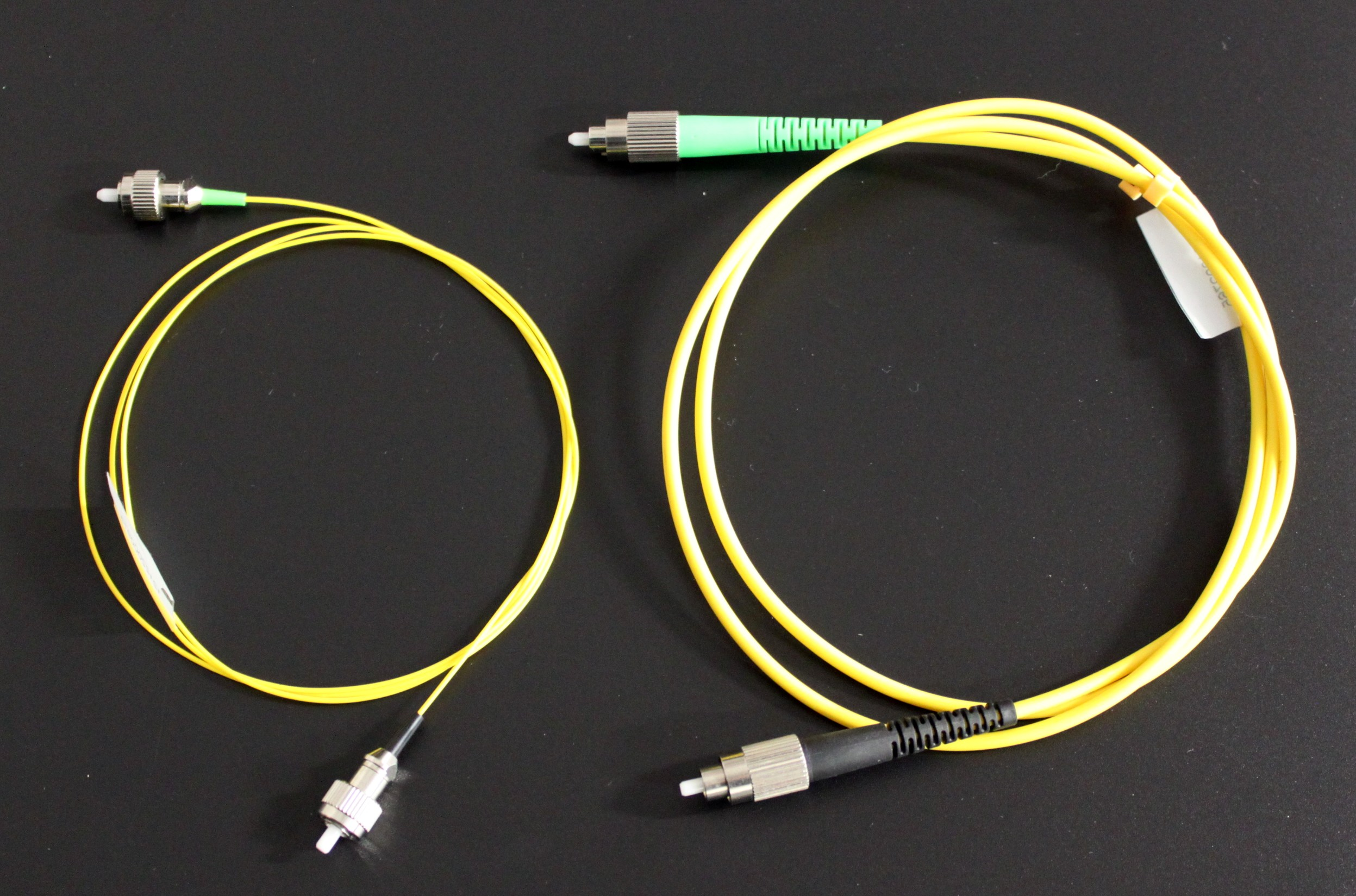
FC-APC/FC-PC patch cords

Patch cords are classified by transmission medium, connector construction, and construction of the connector's inserted core cover.

=== Transmission medium ===
Single-mode fiber is generally yellow, with a blue connector, and a longer transmission distance. Multi-mode fiber is generally orange or grey, with a cream or black connector, and a shorter transmission distance.

=== Connector construction ===
Connector design standards include FC, SC, ST, LC, MTRJ, MPO, MU, SMA, FDDI, E2000, DIN4, and D4. Cables are classified by the connectors on either end of the cable; some of the most common cable configurations include FC–FC, FC–SC, FC–LC, FC–ST, SC–SC, and SC–ST.

=== Inserted core cover ===
The connector's inserted core cover conforms to APC, UPC, or PC configuration. A UPC inserted core cover is flat and is used in SARFT and early CATV. An APC connector's inserted core cover is oblique (about 30°, ±5°). To reduce the back reflection of a connector, UPC polish is used. Industry standard is a maximum of −40 dB for PC back reflection measurement and −50 dB for UPC back reflection measurement. If even less back reflection is required, an APC might be necessary. An APC connector has an 8º angle cut into the ferrule. These connectors are identifiable by their green color. An APC polished connector has a standard reflectivity maximum of −60 dB. APC fiber ends have low back reflection even when disconnected.

=== Armored fiber patch cord ===
Armored fiber-optic patch cord uses a flexible protective tube, usually stainless steel, inside the outer jacket as the armor to protect the fiber glass inside. It will not get damaged even if stepped on, and they are rodent-resistant.

=== Bend-insensitive fiber-optic patch cord ===
Bend-insensitive fiber patch cord is widely used in fiber to the home (FTTH). Single-mode bend-insensitive fibers include G657A1, G657A2, G657B2, and G657B3.

=== Mode-conditioning patch cord ===
A mode-conditioning patch cord is required where Gigabit 1000 Base-LX routers and switches are installed into existing multimode cable plants. The transceiver modules launch only single-mode 1300 nm signals but the existing network is built with multimode cables.

With a single-mode laser aimed into the center of a multimode fiber, the signal arriving at the far end, having followed various paths in the fiber, is spread out in time, making fast transitions between light and dark impossible to discern, and the problem increases with fiber length. This spreading in time is called differential mode delay (DMD) and limits the fiber length for Gigabit Ethernet sigalling. A mode-conditioning patch cord eliminates these multiple signals by aligning the single-mode launch away from the center of a multimode fiber core. This offset launch creates a transmitted signal that is similar to a typical multimode light-emitting diode (LED) launch.
