= Physical medium dependent =

Physical medium dependent sublayers or PMDs further help to define the physical layer of computer network protocols. They define the details of transmission and reception of individual bits on a physical medium. These responsibilities encompass bit timing, signal encoding, interacting with the physical medium, and the properties of the cable, optical fiber, or wire itself. Common examples are specifications for Fast Ethernet, Gigabit Ethernet and 10 Gigabit Ethernet defined by the Institute of Electrical and Electronics Engineers (IEEE).

For cable modems physical medium dependent sublayers define the physical sub-layer.

== Description ==
The Ethernet PMD sublayer is part of the Ethernet physical layer (PHY). The hierarchy is as follows:

- Data link layer (Layer 2)
  - Logical link control (LLC) sublayer
  - Medium access control (MAC) sublayer
    - Reconciliation sublayer (RS) – This sublayer processes PHY local/remote fault messages and handles DDR conversion
- PHY layer (Layer 1)
  - Physical coding sublayer (PCS) – This sublayer performs auto-negotiation and coding such as 8b/10b
  - Physical medium attachment (PMA) sublayer – This sublayer performs PMA framing, octet synchronization/detection, and $x^7+x^6+1$ scrambling/descrambling
  - Physical medium dependent (PMD) sublayer – This sublayer consists of a transceiver for the physical medium

== Physical medium dependent sublayer specifications ==
=== 10 Gigabit Ethernet ===
10GBASE-E
has been defined for single-mode fiber operation only. It operates in the 1550 nm band allowing for distances of up to 40 km to be reached.

10GBASE-L
was also defined for single-mode fiber operations, uses the 1300 nm band allowing it to reach up to 10 km.

10GBASE-S
was defined for use in multimode fiber and ultimately costs less than the other 10GbE standards. It uses 850 nm lasers and only reaches distances ranging between 26 and 82 metres on older fiber technology. In newer optimized multimode fibers (a.k.a. OM3) it can reach up to 300 m.

10GBASE-LX4
uses four lasers that each transmit at 3.125 Gbit/s. The receiver is arranged in a wavelength-division multiplexing manner. On legacy FDDI multimode fiber it can reach up to 300 m while on single-mode fiber it can reach up to 10 km.

After these specifications have been laid out, they are then completed with local area network and wide area network specifications using different physical coding sublayer standards.
