= Gigabit interface converter =

Standard for transceivers

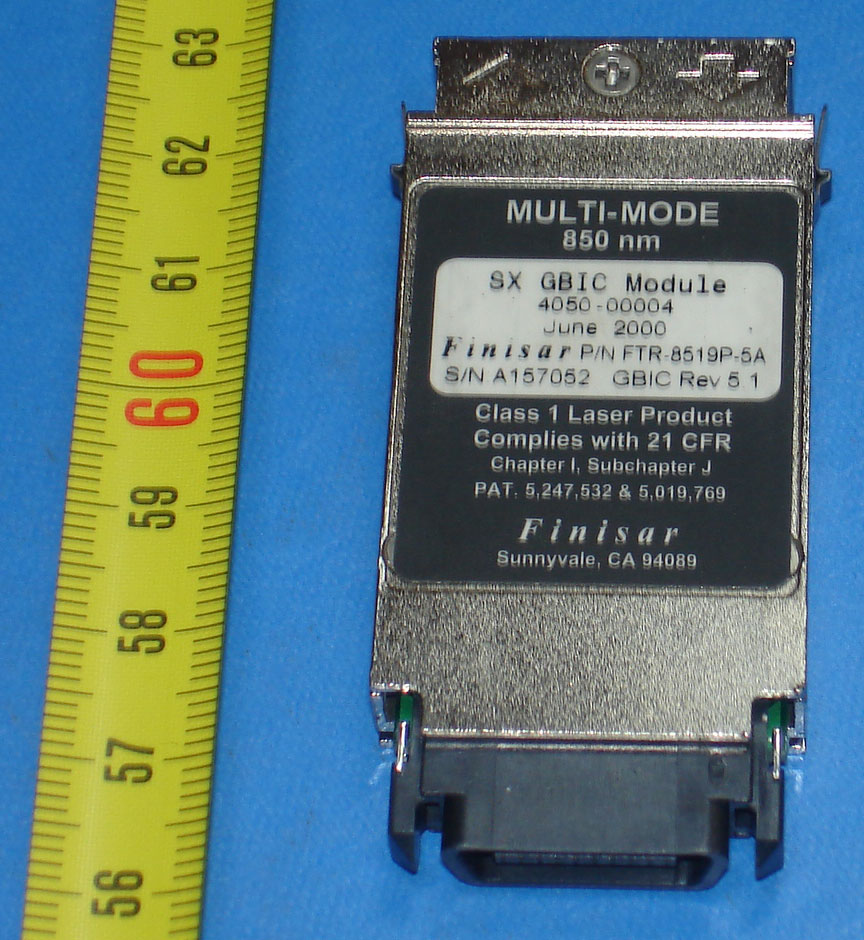
1000BASE-SX GBIC

Gigabit interface converter (GBIC) is a standard for transceivers. First defined in 1995, it was used with Gigabit Ethernet and Fibre Channel. By standardizing on a hot swappable electrical interface, a single gigabit port can support a wide range of physical media, from copper to long-wave single-mode optical fiber, at lengths of hundreds of kilometers.

The Small Form-factor Pluggable (SFP) transceiver, also known as mini-GBIC, succeeds GBIC. Announced in 2001, it obsoleted GBIC.

== Appeal ==
Flexibility is the benefit of hot-swappable transceivers like the GBIC standard as opposed to fixed physical interface configurations. Where optical technologies are mixed, an administrator can just-in-time purchase GBICs of the specific type for each link. This flexibility lowers fixed costs. However, if one port type such as copper predominates, a switch with built-in ports is cheaper and space efficient.

== Standards ==
The GBIC standard is openly defined by the Small Form Factor Committee in document number 8053i. The first publication was in November 1995. A few corrections and additions were made through September 2000. Robert Snively of Brocade Communications was the technical editor. The original contributors were AMP Incorporated, Compaq Computers, Sun Microsystems, and Vixel Corporation.
