= Common Electrical I/O =

Set of hardware interoperability agreements

The Common Electrical I/O (CEI) refers to a series of influential Interoperability Agreements (IAs) that have been published by the Optical Internetworking Forum (OIF). CEI defines the electrical and jitter requirements for 3.125, 6, 11, 25-28, and 56 Gbit/s electrical interfaces.

== CEI, the Common Electrical I/O ==
The Common Electrical I/O (CEI) Interoperability Agreement published by the OIF defines the electrical and jitter requirements for 3.125, 6, 11, 25-28, and 56 Gbit/s SerDes interfaces. This CEI specification has defined SerDes interfaces for the industry since 2004, and it has been highly influential. The development of electrical interfaces at the OIF began with SPI-3 in 2000, and the first differential interface was published in 2003. The seventh generation electrical interface, CEI-56G, defines five reaches of 56 Gbit/s interfaces. The OIF completed work on its eighth generation through its CEI-112G project. The OIF has launched its ninth generation with its CEI-224G project. CEI has influenced or has been adopted or adapted in many other serial interface standards by many different standards organizations over its long lifetime. SerDes interfaces have been developed based on CEI for most ASIC and FPGA products.

== CEI direct predecessors ==
Throughout the 2000s, the OIF produced an important series of interfaces that influenced the development of multiple generations of devices. Beginning with the donation of the PL-3 interface by PMC-Sierra in 2000, the OIF produced the System Packet Interface (SPI) family of packet interfaces. SPI-3 and SPI-4.2 defined two generations of devices before they were supplanted by the closely related Interlaken standard in the SPI-5 generation in 2006.

The OIF also defined the SerDes Framer Interface (SFI) family of specifications in parallel with SPI. As a part of the SPI-5 and SFI-5 development, a common electrical interface was developed termed SxI-5. SxI-5 abstracted the electrical I/O interface away from the individual SPI and SFI documents. This abstraction laid the groundwork for the highly successful CEI family of Interoperability Agreements and was incorporated in the original release of CEI 1.0 a generation later.

== Generations of OIF Electrical Interfaces ==
Gen.	IA Title	Pub. as	Clause #'s	Max per pair	Mult. of bit rate per wire	Typical appli -cation	Year pub.	Adopted, adapted or influenced	Num. ranges	Modu- lations
9	CEI-224G			232 Gbit/s	1160x	1600GE thru 200GE		IEEE 802.3dj		PAM-4
8	CEI-112G	CEI 5.0	23-4, 26-7	116 Gbit/s	580x	800GE thru 100GE	2022	IEEE 802.3ck, Infiniband NDR, 128G Fibre Channel and others	4	PAM-4 and CNRZ-5
7	CEI-56G	CEI 4.0	16-22	56 Gbit/s	290x	400GE thru 50GE	2017	IEEE 802.3bs and 802.3cd, Infiniband HDR, 64G Fibre Channel	5	NRZ, PAM-4 and ENRZ
6.5	CEI-28G (added 25G LR)	CEI 3.1	11	28 Gbit/s (25 for LR)	140x	100GE thru 25GE	2011	InfiniBand EDR, 32G Fibre Channel, SATA 3.2, IEEE 802.3 100GBASE-KR4, 100GBASE-CR4 and CAUI4, SAS-4, Interlaken 1.9	4	NRZ
6	CEI-28G	CEI 3.0,	10, 12-14	28 Gbit/s	140x	100GE thru 25GE	2008	InfiniBand EDR, 32GFC, SATA 3.2, IEEE 802.3 CAUI4, SAS-4, Interlaken 1.9	4	NRZ
5	CEI-11G	CEI 2.0	8-9	11 Gbit/s	55x	OC-768, 100GE, 40GE	2008	InfiniBand QDR, 10GBASE-KR, 10GFC, 16GFC, SAS-3, RapidIO v3, Interlaken	3	NRZ
4	CEI-6G	CEI 1.0	6-7	6 Gbit/s	30x	OC-768 (~40 Gbit/s)	2004	4GFC, 8GFC, InfiniBand DDR, SATA 3.0, SAS-2, RapidIO v2, HyperTransport 3.1, Interlaken	2	NRZ
3	SxI-5	SxI-5 and CEI 1.0	4-5	3.125 Gbit/s	16x	OC-192, 10GE	2002, 2004	Interlaken, SPI-5, SFI-5, FC 2G, InfiniBand SDR, XAUI, 10GBASE-KX4, 10GBASE-CX4, SATA 2.0, SAS-1, RapidIO v1	1	NRZ
2	SPI-4.2	SPI-4, 4.2		0.8 Gbit/s	4x	OC-48 (2.488 Gbit/s)	2001-2	HyperTransport 1.03	1	NRZ
1	SPI-3	SPI-3		0.1 Gbit/s (single ended)	1 (ref)	OC-12 (0.622 Gbit/s)	2000	(From PMC-Sierra's PL-3)	1	NRZ

Two earlier generations in this development path were defined by some of the same individuals at the ATM Forum in 1994 and 1995. These specifications were called UTOPIA Level 1 and 2. These operated at 25 Mbit/s (0.025 Gbit/s) and 50 Mbit/s per wire single ended and were used in OC-3 (155 Mbit/s) applications. PL-3 was a packet extension of the cells carried by those earlier interfaces.

== Public demonstrations ==
Compliant implementations to the draft CEI-56G IAs were demonstrated in the OIF booth at the Optical Fiber Conference in 2015, 2016 and 2017.
