= Optical module =

Optical transceiver used in high-bandwidth data communications

An optical module is a typically hot-pluggable optical transceiver used in high-bandwidth data communications applications. Optical modules typically have an electrical interface on the side that connects to the inside of the system and an optical interface on the side that connects to the outside world through a fiber optic cable. The form factor and electrical interface are often specified by an interested group using a multi-source agreement (MSA). Optical modules can either plug into a front panel socket or an on-board socket. Sometimes the optical module is replaced by an electrical interface module that implements either an active or passive electrical connection to the outside world. A large industry supports the manufacturing and use of optical modules.

== Electrical Interface Types ==
There have been multiple variants of the electrical interface of optical modules that have been used over the years.

=== Analog direct ===
The earliest forms of optical modules had an analog NRZ electrical interface. In the transmit direction, the optical module would directly drive the laser or LED with the analog signal coming from the front system card. In the receive direction, the module would directly drive the receive electrical interface with the output of the analog optical-to-electrical receiver circuit.

=== Digital (retimed) ===
As speeds increased, the electrical interface was changed to a retimed digital interface. The Common Electrical Interface (CEI), defined by the Optical Internetworking Forum (OIF) served as the central defining document for these interfaces. The IEEE 802.3 Ethernet working group has also been influential in the definition of the module interface.

=== Digital (unretimed) ===
In order to save power within the module, optical modules have been made that used the digital interface definition, such as the CEI, but without retiming the signals within the module. These modules delivered an analog connection between the two ends.

=== Analog Coherent Optics (ACO) ===
The Optical Internetworking Forum in 2016 published the CFP2-ACO or CFP2 - Analog Coherent Optics Module Interoperability Agreement (IA). This IA supports a configuration where the digital signal processor (DSP) is on the main board and analog optical components are on the module. This IA is useful in the case when the DSP exceeds the module power envelope. The ACO interface can be used in coherent optics applications when the link delivers a flexible amount of bandwidth to the system, for example when combined with FlexE. The initial ACO IA is for the CFP2 module. The typical optical modulation that are used include Dual Polarization Quadrature Phase Shift Keying (DP-QPSK) and QAM-16.

=== Digital Coherent Optics (DCO) ===
These modules put the DSP on the module and use a conventional retimed digital interface. These modules can use the same optical modulation techniques as the ACO interfaces do.

== Optical modulation and multiplexing types ==
Many different forms of optical modulation and multiplexing have been employed in optical modules.

=== NRZ and PAM-4 direct modulation ===
The most common modulation technique historically has been on-off keying or NRZ. Pulse-amplitude modulation (PAM-4) has also been extensively used.

=== Coherent modulation ===
In the 2010s, coherent optical modulation has been used. Techniques include Dual Polarization Quadrature Phase Shift Keying (DP-QPSK) and QAM-16.

=== Tunable optical frequency ===
Tunable lasers are sometimes used to allow a module to support various forms of network-based optical switching such as needed in certain cases by an optical mesh networks or a Reconfigurable optical add-drop multiplexer (ROADM). In these, the transmit laser can be tuned to a different optical frequency/wavelength. Similarly, the receiver is able to receive different optical frequencies.

=== Lambda multiplexing ===
Different optical wavelengths, also referred to as lambdas, of light are multiplexed in some optical modules using wavelength-division multiplexing (WDM). Variants include Coarse WDM (CWDM), Dense WDM (DWDM).

== In-module components ==
Optical modules have a series of components inside, some of which have received attention from standards development organizations.

=== In-module gearbox ===
In many cases, the baud rate of the optical interface does not equal the baud rate of the electrical interface. In these cases, a gearbox is used within the module to convert between the two rates. For example if the module supports 4 x 25 Gb/s electrical inputs and 2 wavelengths of 50 Gb/s optical interface, then a gearbox must convert between 25 and 50 GBaud.

=== In-module forward error correction ===
Particularly in the long-reach module market, in-module Forward Error Correction (FEC) has been included. This has been in both proprietary and standards-based forms.

=== In-module optical transceiver implementation agreements ===
The OIF has created interoperability agreements to create multi-vendor interoperability for a series of in-module components, particularly focused on coherent transmission. These have included

- High Bandwidth Integrated Polarization Multiplexed Quadrature Modulators
- Integrated Polarization Multiplexed Quadrature Modulated Transmitters
- Integrated Dual Polarization Micro-Intradyne Coherent Receivers

=== In-module tunable laser implementation agreements ===
The OIF has created interoperability agreements to create multi-vendor interoperability for the tunable lasers that are sometimes used in optical modules. These have included

- Integrable Tunable Laser Assembly Multi Source Agreement
- Micro Integrable Tunable Laser Assembly Implementation Agreement

=== Transmit Optical Sub-Assembly ===
The Transmit Optical Sub-Assembly or TOSA in the optical module converts electrical signals into optical signals for optical transmitters.

== Electrical cable equivalent ==
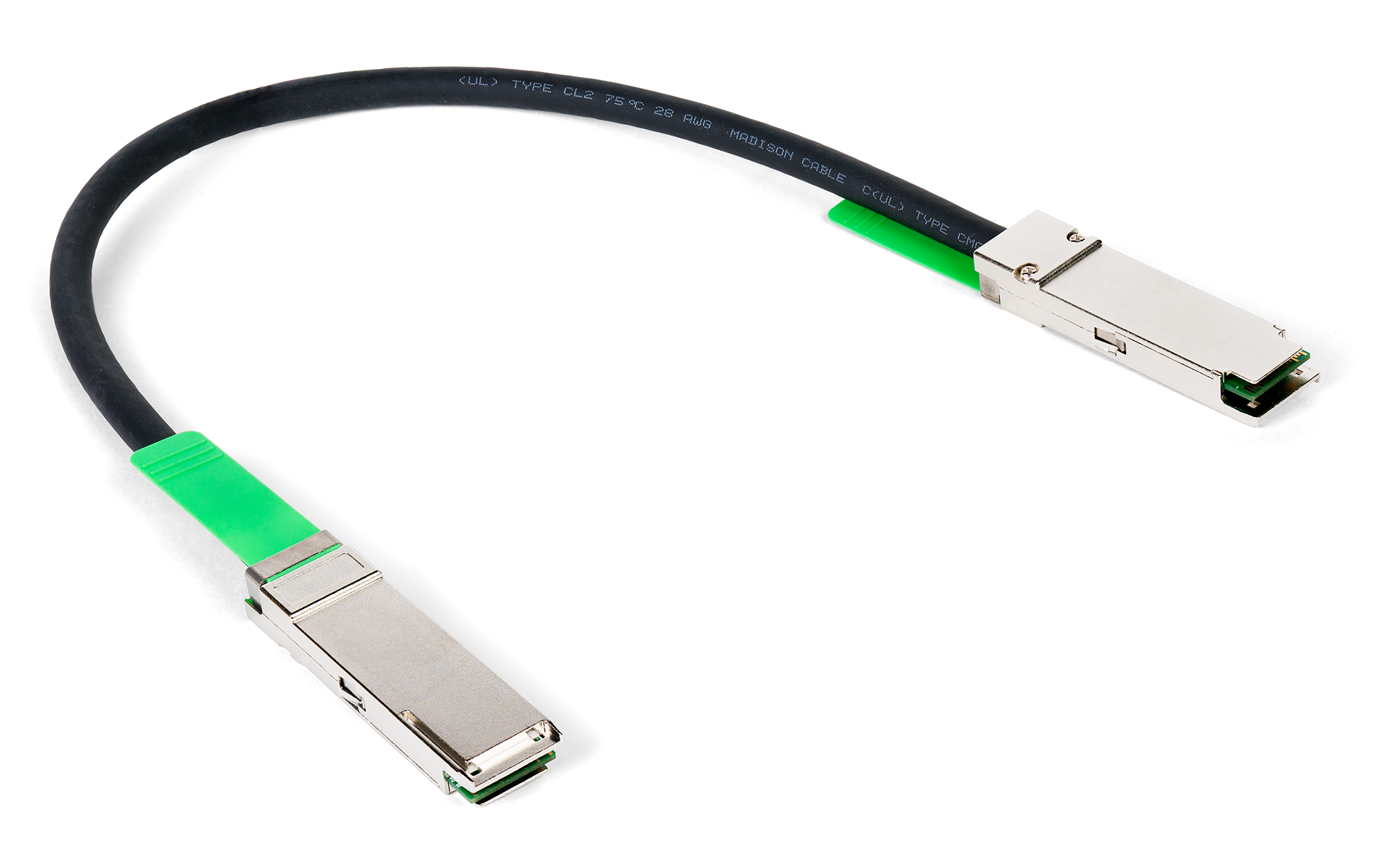
40Gb QSFP+ copper twinax cable

Sometimes the optical module is replaced by an electrical interface module that implements either an active or passive electrical connection to the outside world. This is used when the link is short, particularly when connecting to a top of rack switch.

== Front panel optical module MSAs ==
Many Multi-source agreements (MSAs) have come and gone over the years in the optical module industry.

=== SFP and QSFP family front-panel modules ===
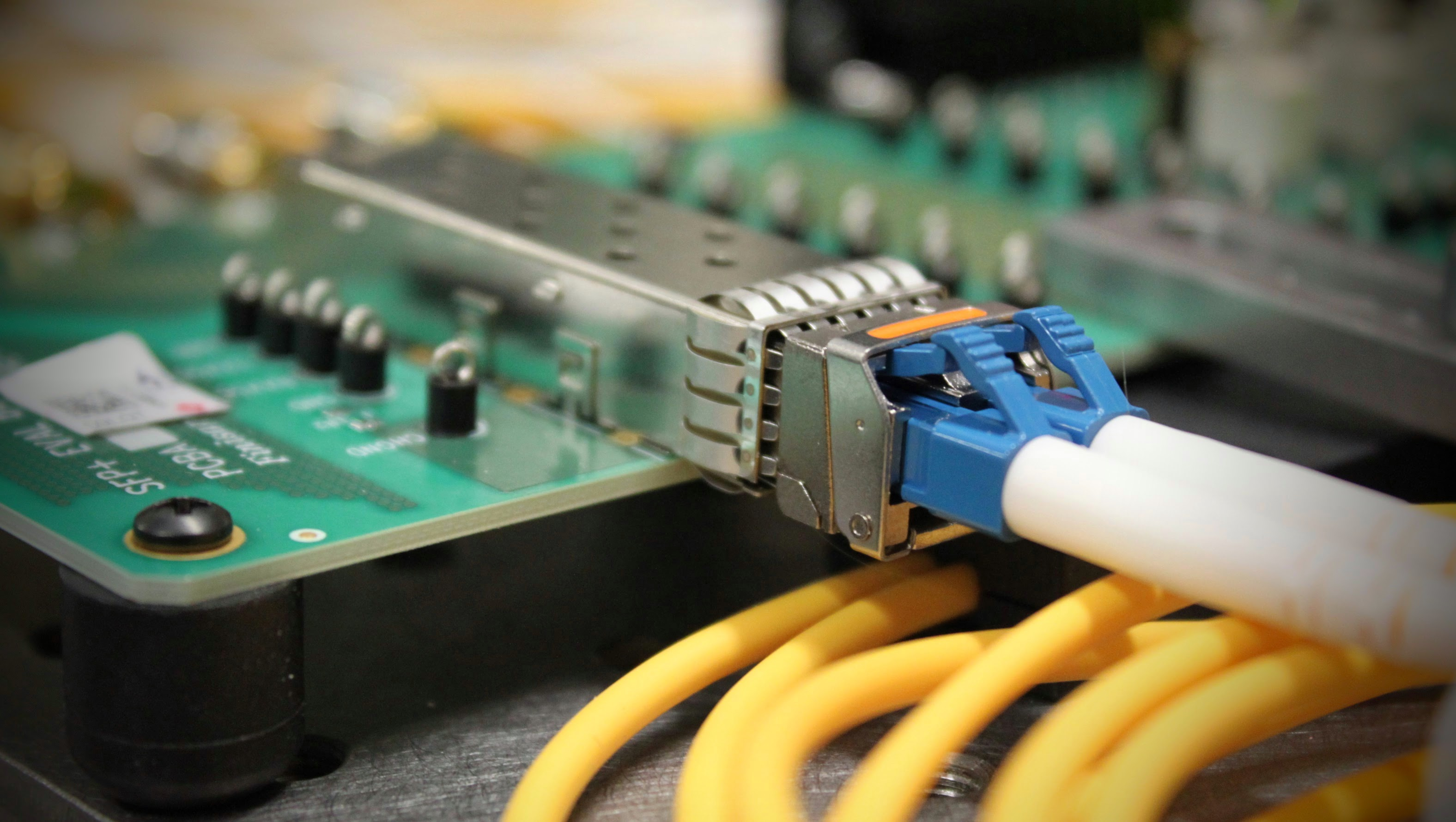
SFP board 2

The Small Form-factor Pluggable (SFP) MSA has specified many optical module form factors over the years.

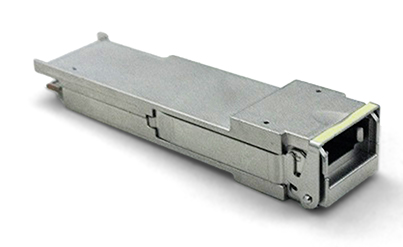
QSFP-40G-SR4 Transceiver

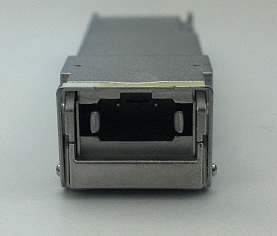
Mpo-connector QSFP

- Small Form-factor Pluggable (SFP)
- QSFP - Quad SFP
- QSFP28 - 4 x 28 Gb/s interface
- QSFP-DD - double density QSFP
- MicroQSFP
- OSFP transceiver - slightly larger 400GbE transceiver standard

=== CFP family front-panel modules ===
The C form-factor pluggable (CFP) is an MSA among competing manufacturers for a common form-factor for the transmission of high-speed digital signals. The letter "C" in the name stands for the Latin letter C used to express the number 100 (centum), since the standard was primarily developed for 100 Gigabit Ethernet systems.

The original CFP specification was proposed at a time when 10 Gbit/s signals were far more achievable than 25 Gbit/s signals. As such to achieve 100 Gbit/s line rate, the most affordable solution was based on 10 lanes of 10 Gbit/s. However, as expected, improvements in technology have allowed higher performance and higher density. Hence the development of the CFP2 and CFP4 specifications. While electrically similar, they specify a form-factor of 1/2 and 1/4 respectively in size of the original specification. Note that CFP, CFP2 and CFP4 modules are not interchangeable (but are inter-operable at the optical interface with appropriate connectors).

- C form-factor pluggable (CFP)
- CFP2
- CFP4
- CFP8

=== XENPAK, XPAK and X2 front panel modules ===
The XENPAK MSA was publicly announced on March 12, 2001 and the first revision of the document was publicly released on May 7, 2001 and was a multisource agreement (MSA), instigated by Agilent Technologies and Agere Systems, that defines a fiber-optic or wired transceiver module which conforms to the 10 Gigabit Ethernet (10GbE) standard of the Institute of Electrical and Electronics Engineers (IEEE) 802.3 working group. XENPAK has been replaced by more compact devices providing the same functionality. The most recent revision of the MSA, Issue 3.0, was published on September 18, 2002. The result covered all physical media dependent (PMD) types defined by the IEEE at that time for 802.3ae 10GbE. Soon after the standard was introduced in 2001, two related standards emerged: XPAK and the X2. These two standards had the same electrical interface as XENPAK (known as XAUI) but different mechanical properties.

=== XFP family of front panel modules ===
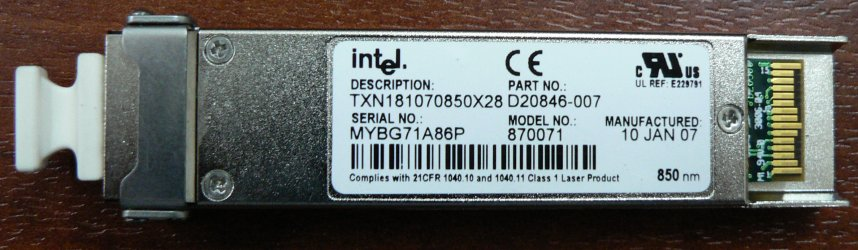
Intel XFP Transceiver (MultiMode Fiber Optics)

The XFP (10 Gigabit Small Form Factor Pluggable) is a standard for transceivers for high-speed computer network and telecommunication links that use optical fiber. It was defined by an industry group in 2002, along with its interface to other electrical components, which is called XFI. XFP is a slightly larger form factor than the popular Small Form-factor Pluggable, SFP and SFP+ .

=== OIF Multisource Agreement for 100G Long-Haul DWDM Transmission Module ===
The Optical Internetworking Forum defined a module for long-haul optics. Most of the other optical MSAs are focused on the data center market.

=== Other front-panel modules ===
- CPAK - Cisco specific module

== On-Board Optical module MSAs ==
A recent trend has been to put pluggable modules on top of the printed circuit board instead of on the front panel. Two MSAs are working on implementation agreements for this market.

=== COBO family on-board modules ===
The Coalition for On-Board Optics (COBO) was established in 2014 to provide a home for the standardization of optical interfaces that were located on the middle of boards rather than on the front panel.

=== CFP family on-board modules ===
- MSA 5″×7″ (Gen 1)
- MSA 4″×5″ (Gen 2)

== Users of Optical Modules ==
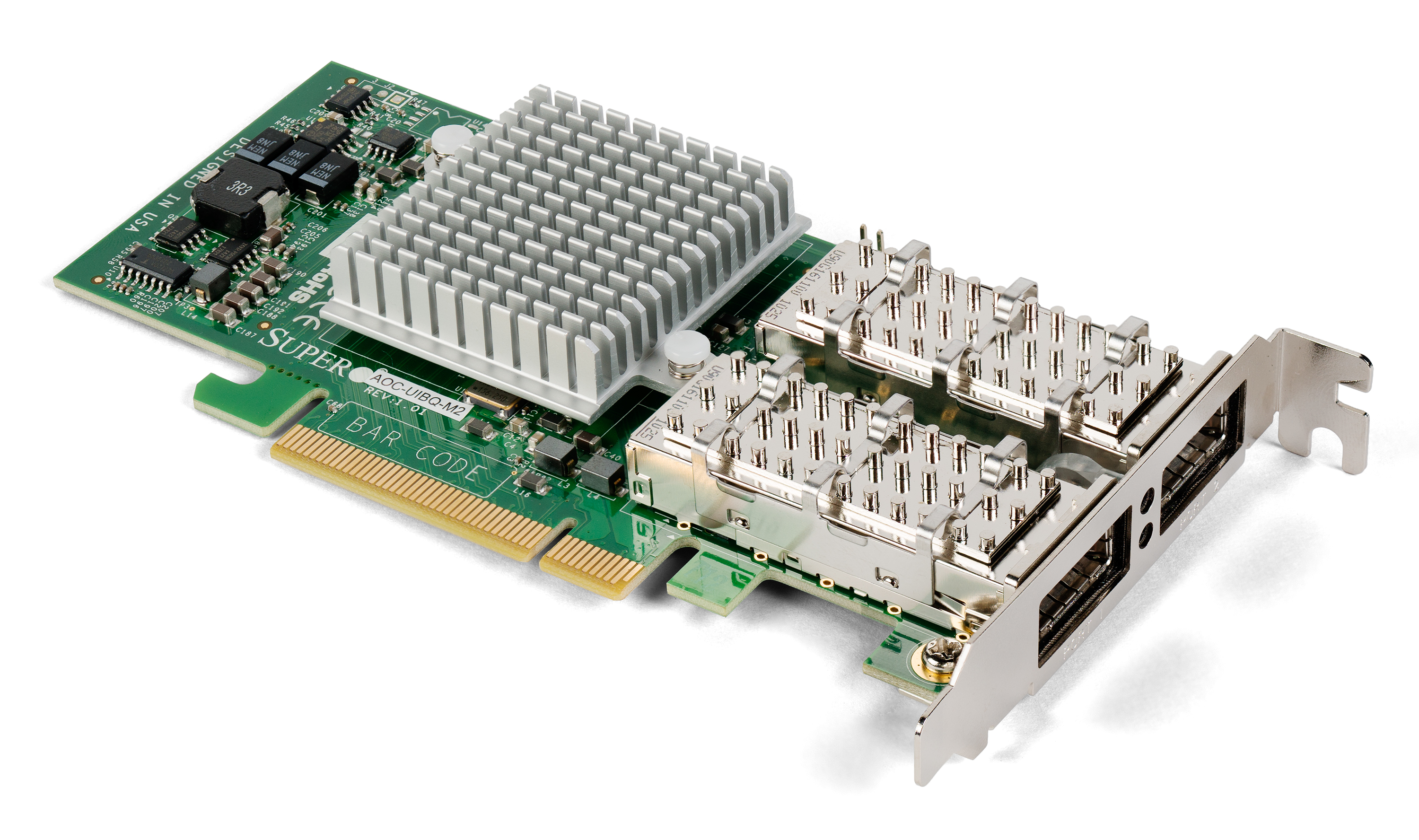
Supermicro AOC-UIBQ-M2 dual port InfiniBand HCA

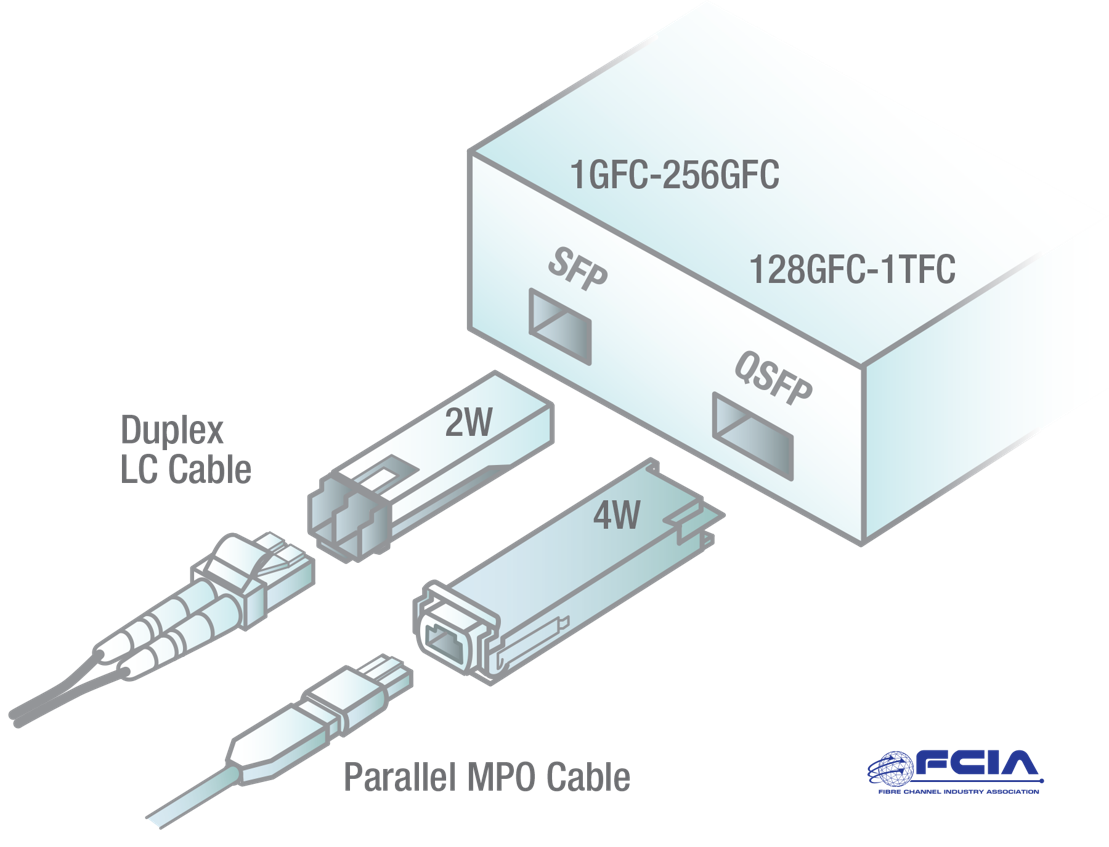
Fibre Channel Media and Modules

Multiple standards have used optical modules. Some of these more prominent standards are discussed below.

=== Infiniband ===
InfiniBand (abbreviated IB) is a computer-networking communications standard used in high-performance computing that features very high throughput and very low latency. It is used for data interconnect both among and within computers. InfiniBand is also utilized as either a direct, or switched interconnect between servers and storage systems, as well as an interconnect between storage systems. Infiniband uses optical modules extensively.

=== Fiber Channel ===
Fibre Channel (FC) is a high-speed network technology (commonly running at 1, 2, 4, 8, 16, 32, and 128 gigabit per second rates) primarily used to connect computer data storage to servers. Fibre Channel is mainly used in storage area networks (SAN) in commercial data centers. Fibre Channel networks form a switched fabric because they operate in unison as one big switch. Fibre Channel typically runs on optical fiber cables within and between data centers. Fibre Channel uses optical modules extensively.

=== Ethernet ===
Ethernet is a family of computer networking technologies commonly used in local area networks (LAN), metropolitan area networks (MAN) and wide area networks (WAN). Ethernet uses optical modules extensively in its higher rate interfaces. Representative interfaces that are commonly implemented in optical modules include 100GBASE-SR4, 100GBASE-LR4 and 100GBASE-ER4.

== Optical module focused trade shows ==
OFC Logo blue July 2014

The main trade show for the large optical module industry is the Optical Fiber Conference (OFC), that is held annually in southern California. Other prominent shows for the industry include ECOC in Europe and FOE in Japan.

== See also ==
- CXP (connector)
