= Coherent optical module =

Optical transceiver that uses coherent modulation

Coherent optical module refers to a typically hot-pluggable coherent optical transceiver that uses coherent modulation (BPSK/QPSK/QAM) rather than amplitude modulation (RZ/NRZ/PAM4) and is typically used in high-bandwidth data communications applications. Optical modules typically have an electrical interface on the side that connects to the inside of the system and an optical interface on the side that connects to the outside world through a fiber optic cable. The technical details of coherent optical modules were proprietary for many years, but have recently attracted efforts by multi-source agreement (MSA) groups and a standards development organizations such as the Optical Internetworking Forum. Coherent optical modules can either plug into a front panel socket or an on-board socket. Coherent optical modules form a smaller piece of a much larger optical module industry.

== Electrical Interface Types ==
There are multiple variants of the electrical interface of coherent optical modules use.

=== Analog Coherent Optics (ACO) ===
The Optical Internetworking Forum in 2016 published the CFP2-ACO or CFP2 - Analog Coherent Optics Module Interoperability Agreement (IA). This IA supports a configuration where the digital signal processor (DSP) is on the main board and analog optical components are on the module. This IA is useful in the case when the DSP exceeds the module power envelope. The ACO interface can be used in coherent optics applications when the link delivers a flexible amount of bandwidth to the system, for example when combined with FlexE. The initial ACO IA is for the CFP2 module. The typical optical modulations that are used include Dual Polarization Quadrature Phase Shift Keying (DP-QPSK) and Quadrature Amplitude Modulation QAM-16.

=== Digital Coherent Optics (DCO) ===
These modules put the DSP on the module and use a conventional retimed digital interface. These modules can use the same optical modulation techniques as the ACO interfaces do.

== Optical modulation and multiplexing types ==
Many different forms of optical modulation and multiplexing have been employed in coherent optical modules.

=== NRZ and PAM-4 modulation ===
Some coherent optical modules can fall back to older, simpler modulation techniques such as on-off keying (NRZ) and/or Pulse-amplitude modulation with 4 levels (PAM-4) when appropriate. This is used, for example, when it is discovered that the module on the other end of the link does not support coherent modulation.

=== Coherent modulation ===
Techniques include Dual Polarization Quadrature Phase Shift Keying (DP-QPSK) and QAM-16.

=== Tunable optical frequency ===
Tunable lasers are sometimes used in combination with coherent modulation to allow a module to support various forms of network-based optical switching such as needed in certain cases by an optical mesh networks or a Reconfigurable optical add-drop multiplexer (ROADM). In these, the transmit laser can be tuned to a different optical frequency/wavelength. Similarly the receiver is able to receive different optical frequencies.

=== Lambda multiplexing ===
Different optical wavelengths, also referred to as lambdas, of light are multiplexed within some coherent optical modules using wavelength-division multiplexing (WDM). Variants include Coarse WDM (CWDM), Dense WDM (DWDM).

== In-module components ==
Coherent optical modules have a series of components inside, some of which have received attention from standards development organizations.

=== In-module gearbox ===
In many cases, the baud rate of the coherent optical interface does not equal the baud rate of the electrical interface. In these cases, a "gearbox" may be used within the module to convert between the rates. Because coherent modules typically have Digital Signal Processors, these gearbox functions sometimes are implemented in firmware.

=== In-module forward error correction ===
Particularly in the long-reach module market, in-module Forward Error Correction (FEC) has been included. This has been in both proprietary and standards-based forms. Coherent optical modules sometimes have used soft-decision decoder FEC algorithms

=== In-module optical transceiver implementation agreements ===
The OIF has created interoperability agreements to create multi-vendor interoperability for a series of in-module components, particularly focused on coherent transmission. These have included

- High Bandwidth Integrated Polarization Multiplexed Quadrature Modulators
- Integrated Polarization Multiplexed Quadrature Modulated Transmitters
- Integrated Dual Polarization Micro-Intradyne Coherent Receivers

=== In-module tunable laser implementation agreements ===
The OIF has created interoperability agreements to create multi-vendor interoperability for the tunable lasers that are sometimes used in optical modules. These have included

- Integrable Tunable Laser Assembly Multi Source Agreement
- Micro Integrable Tunable Laser Assembly Implementation Agreement

== Front panel optical module MSAs ==
Several Multi-source agreements (MSAs) have coherent optical modules.

=== QSFP family front-panel modules ===
- QSFP - Quad SFP
- QSFP28 - 4 x 28 Gb/s interface
- QSFP-DD - double density QSFP
- MicroQSFP
- OSFP transceiver

=== CFP family front-panel modules ===
The C form-factor pluggable (CFP) is an MSA among competing manufacturers for a common form-factor for the transmission of high-speed digital signals.

- CFP2
- CFP4
- CFP8

== On-Board Optical module MSAs ==
Some pluggable modules fit on top of the printed circuit board instead of on the front panel.

=== CFP family on-board modules ===
- MSA 5″×7″ (Gen 1)
- MSA 4″×5″ (Gen 2)

== Users of Coherent optical Modules ==
Long-haul Optical Transport Network (OTN) networks were the traditional users of coherent modulation. Cloud scale data centers have become an important consumer of coherent optical modules, particularly in the Ethernet connectivity space for reaches greater than 10 km where the advantages of coherent modulation can outweigh the increased cost.

== Optical module focused trade shows ==
OFC Logo blue July 2014

The main trade show for the coherent optical module industry is the Optical Fiber Conference (OFC), that is held annually in southern California. Other prominent shows for the industry include ECOC in Europe and FOE in Japan.
