= SATURN Development Group =

The SATURN Development Group was an important industry forum that enabled the specification of chip-to-chip interfaces for the communications industry. It was co-founded in 1992 by PMC-Sierra and Sun Microsystems. Several significant specifications were completed through its actions including PL-2, PL-3, and PL-4. Many important semiconductor devices were developed to these specifications. SATURN was also influential in the specification of the ATM Forum's physical layer "UTOPIA" standards.

Initial members included SynOptics and Interphase. The first meeting was held in April 1992. By August 1993, the SATURN group had 28 members.

After the formation of the Optical Internetworking Forum (OIF), two of the SATURN group's interfaces were successfully adopted by OIF. The PL-3 specification became SPI-3 and the PL-4 specification became SPI-4.2. The existence of the OIF also eliminated the need for the SATURN Development Group, and it was wound down around 2002.
