= TFI-5 =

Standard in optical communications

TFI-5 in computer networking is a standardized TDM Fabric to Framer Interface by the Optical Internetworking Forum (OIF) that allow both framer components and switch components from multiple vendors to inter-operate facilitating the development of add/drop multiplexers, TDM cross connect and grooming switches. The TFI-5 standard includes link integrity monitoring, connection management and mapping mechanisms for both SONET/SDH and non-SONET/SDH clients such as Ethernet and Fibre Channel.

The main application of TFI-5 is for Time-division multiplexing (TDM). This contrast with other OFI standards such SPI-5 which target packet/cell applications.

OFI level 5 standards that covered interfaces of 40 Gbit/s.

== See also ==
- TDM
- SFI-5
- Optical Internetworking Forum
- Framer
