= OIF =

OIF may refer to:

- Ocean iron fertilization, the intentional introduction of iron to the upper ocean to stimulate a phytoplankton bloom
- Office for Intellectual Freedom, a department of the American Library Association
- Operation Iraqi Freedom, the United States' code-name for the Iraq War from 2003 to 2010
- Optical Internetworking Forum, a non-profit industry organization founded in 1998
- Organisation internationale de la Francophonie, an international organization representing Francophonic and Francophilic countries and regions
