= TDM Fabric to Framer Interface =

Type of interface in optical networking

A TDM Fabric to Framer Interface is a type of interface used in optical networking. TDM refers to time division multiplexing. Some commonly used TDM variants include:

- TFI-4
- TFI-5

== See also ==
- Optical Internetworking Forum
