= Packet over SONET/SDH =

Communications protocol for transferring packets over fiber networks

Packet over SONET/SDH, abbreviated POS, (Note: POS (packet over SONET) is a double-nested abbreviation. The S represents "SONET/SDH", which itself stands for "Synchronous Optical Network/Synchronous Digital Hierarchy". Given this, POS technically stands for "Packet over Synchronous Optical Network/Synchronous Digital Hierarchy".) is a communications protocol for transmitting packets in the form of the Point to Point Protocol (PPP) over SDH or SONET, which are both standard protocols for communicating digital information using lasers or light emitting diodes (LEDs) over optical fibre at high line rates.

POS is defined by RFC 2615 as PPP over SONET/SDH. PPP was designed as a standard method of communicating over point-to-point links and is thus suited to SONET/SDH links because these use point-to-point circuits.

== History ==
Cisco was involved in making POS an important wide area network protocol. PMC-Sierra produced an important series of early semiconductor devices which implemented POS.

== Applications ==
The most important application of POS is to support sending of IP packets across wide area networks. Large amounts of traffic on the Internet are carried over POS links. POS is also one of the link layers used by the Resilient Packet Ring standard known as IEEE 802.17.

== Security ==
Scrambling is performed during insertion of the PPP packets into the SONET/SDH frame to avoid various security attacks including denial-of-service attacks and the imitation of SONET/SDH alarms. This modification was justified as cost-effective because the scrambling algorithm was already used by the standard used to transport ATM cells over SONET/SDH. However, scrambling can optionally be disabled to allow a node to be compatible with another node that uses the now obsoleted RFC 1619 version of Packet over SONET/SDH which lacks the scrambler.

== Complementary Interfaces ==
The System Packet Interface series of standards from the Optical Internetworking Forum including SPI-4.2 and SPI-3 and their predecessors PL-4 and PL-3 are commonly used as the interface between packet processing devices and framer devices that implement POS. The acronym PL-4 means POS-PHY Layer 4.

== See also ==
- Ethernet over SONET
