= SPI-3 =

Chip-to-chip, channelized, packet interface

SPI-3 or System Packet Interface Level 3 is the name of a chip-to-chip, channelized, packet interface widely used in high-speed communications devices. It was proposed by PMC-Sierra based on their PL-3 interface to the Optical Internetworking Forum and adopted in June 2000. PL-3 was developed by PMC-Sierra in conjunction with the SATURN Development Group.

== Applications ==
It was designed to be used in systems that support OC-48 SONET interfaces . A typical application of SPI-3 is to connect a framer device to a network processor. It has been widely adopted by the high speed networking marketplace.

== Technical details ==
The interface consists of (per direction):

- 32 TTL signals for the data path
- 8 TTL signals for control
- one TTL signal for clock
- 8 TTL signals for optional additional multi-channel status

There are several clocking options. The interface operates around 100 MHz. Implementations of SPI-3 (PL-3) have been produced which allow somewhat higher clock rates. This is important when overhead bytes are added to incoming packets.

== SPI-3 in the marketplace ==
SPI-3 (and PL-3) was a highly successful interface with many semiconductor devices produced to it.

== See also ==
- System Packet Interface
- SPI-4.2
