= TFI =

TFI may refer to:

== Telugu Film Industry ==
- TFI (Telugu Film Industry), also known as Tollywood, is India's second-largest film industry, producing Telugu-language movies with global recognition.

== Companies and organizations ==
- Taiwan Film Institute, later Taiwan Film and Audiovisual Institute, Taipei
- Teach For India
- TFI International, Canadian transport company

== Governmental entities ==
- The Office of Terrorism and Financial Intelligence, U.S. Treasury
- Transitional Federal Institutions of Somalia, 2004
- Transport for Ireland, public transport authority

== Other uses ==
- TFI-5 in computer networking
- Test de français international, a French language test
- The Family International, formerly Children of God religious movement
- TFI Friday (known as TFI Unplugged since 2026), a Channel 4 show

== See also ==
- TF1, French TV network
