= 25 Gigabit Ethernet =

Standards for Ethernet networking at a data rate of 25 and 50 gigabits per second

25 Gigabit Ethernet and 50 Gigabit Ethernet are standards for Ethernet connectivity in a datacenter environment, developed by IEEE 802.3 task forces 802.3by and 802.3cd and are available from multiple vendors.

== History ==
An industry consortium, 25G Ethernet Consortium, was formed by Arista, Broadcom, Google, Mellanox Technologies and Microsoft in July 2014 to support the specification of single-lane 25-Gbit/s Ethernet and dual-lane 50-Gbit/s Ethernet technology. The 25G Ethernet Consortium specification draft was completed in September 2015 and uses technology from IEEE Std. 802.3ba and IEEE Std. 802.3bj.

In November 2014, an IEEE 802.3 task force was formed to develop a single-lane 25-Gbit/s standard, and in November 2015, a study group was formed to explore the development of a single-lane 50-Gbit/s standard.

In May 2016, an IEEE 802.3 task force was formed to develop a single-lane 50 Gigabit Ethernet standard.

On June 30, 2016, the IEEE 802.3by standard was approved by The IEEE-SA Standards Board.

On November 12, 2018, the IEEE P802.3cn Task Force started working to define PHY supporting 50-Gbit/s operation over at least 40 km of SMF.

The IEEE 802.3cd standard was approved on December 5, 2018.

On December 20, 2019, the IEEE 802.3cn standard was published.

On April 6, 2020, 25 Gigabit Ethernet Consortium rebranded to Ethernet Technology Consortium, and announced an 800 Gigabit Ethernet (GbE) specification.

On June 4, 2020, the IEEE approved IEEE 802.3ca, which allows for symmetric or asymmetric operation with downstream speeds of 25 or 50 Gbit/s, and upstream speeds of 10, 25, or 50 Gbit/s over passive optical networks.

== 25 Gigabit Ethernet ==
The IEEE 802.3by standard uses technology defined for 100 Gigabit Ethernet implemented as four 25-Gbit/s lanes (IEEE 802.3bj). The IEEE 802.3by standard defines several single-lane variations.

Legend for fibre-based PHYs
Fibre type	Introduced	Performance
MMF FDDI 62.5/125 µm	1987	160 MHz·km @ 850 nm
MMF OM1 62.5/125 µm	1989	200 MHz·km @ 850 nm
MMF OM2 50/125 µm	1998	500 MHz·km @ 850 nm
MMF OM3 50/125 µm	2003	1500 MHz·km @ 850 nm
MMF OM4 50/125 µm	2008	3500 MHz·km @ 850 nm
MMF OM5 50/125 µm	2016	3500 MHz·km @ 850 nm and 1850 MHz·km @ 950 nm
SMF OS1 9/125 µm	1998	1.0 dB/km @ 1300/1550 nm
SMF OS2 9/125 µm	2000	0.4 dB/km @ 1300/1550 nm

Name	Standard	Status	Media	Connector	Transceiver module	Reach (m)	# Media (⇆)	# Lambdas (→)	# Lanes (→)	Notes
25 Gigabit Ethernet (25 GbE) – (Data rate: 25 Gbit/s – Line code: 64b/66b with and without RS-FEC(528,514) × NRZ – Line rate: 25.78125 GBd – Full-Duplex)
25GAUI	802.3by-2016 (CL109A/B)	current	Chip-to-chip or chip-to-module interface	—N/a	—N/a	0.25	2	N/A	1	PCBs
25GBASE-KR	802.3by-2016 (CL111)	current	Cu-Backplane	—N/a	—N/a	1	1	N/A	1	PCBs
25GBASE-KR-S	802.3by-2016 (CL111)	current	Cu-Backplane	—N/a	—N/a	1	1	N/A	1	PCBs; without RS-FEC (802.3by CL108)
25GBASE-CR; Direct Attach	802.3by-2016 (CL110)	current	Twinaxial balanced	SFP28 (SFF-8402)	SFP28	5	2	N/A	1	Data centres (inter-rack)
25GBASE-CR-S; Direct Attach	802.3by-2016 (CL110)	current	Twinaxial balanced	SFP28 (SFF-8402)	SFP28	3	1	N/A	1	Data centres (in-rack); without RS-FEC (802.3by CL108)
25GBASE-SR	802.3by-2016 (CL112)	current	Fibre; 850 nm	LC	SFP28	OM3: 70	2	1	1	
25GBASE-SR	802.3by-2016 (CL112)	current	Fibre; 850 nm	LC	SFP28	OM4: 100	2	1	1	
25GBASE-LR	802.3cc-2017 (CL114)	current	Fibre; 1310 nm	LC	SFP28	OS2: 10k	2	1	1	
25GBASE-ER	802.3cc-2017 (CL114)	current	Fibre; 1310 nm	LC	SFP28	OS2: 40k	2	1	1	

25GBASE-T
25GBASE-T, a 25-Gbit/s standard over twisted pair, was approved alongside 40GBASE-T within IEEE 802.3bq.

Comparison of twisted-pair-based Ethernet physical transport layers (TP-PHYs)
Name	Standard	Status	Speed (Mbit/s)	Pairs required	Lanes per direction	Bits per hertz	Line code	Symbol rate per lane (MBd)	Bandwidth	Max distance (m)	Cable	Cable rating (MHz)	Usage
25GBASE-T	802.3bq-2016 (CL113)	current	25000	4	4	6.25	PAM-16 RS-FEC (192, 186) LDPC	2000	1000	30	Cat 8	2000	LAN, Data centres

== Forward Error Correction ==
All fibre and twisted pair versions of 25 Gigabit Ethernet are required to support Reed-Solomon Forward Error Correction, often abbreviated RS-FEC, defined in clause 108 of the IEEE 802.3 standard. This also applies to 25GBASE-CR but not to 25GBASE-CR-S, both of which are variants used in DAC cables. 25GBASE-CR as well as 25GBASE-CR-S are required to support Fire-Code FEC (BASE-R FEC, also FC-FEC, defined in clause 74 of IEEE 802.3). While RS-FEC has to be supported for the mentioned 25 G versions, clause 108 also mandates that it has to be possible to turn FEC off, which makes it possible to not use FEC if desired.

For an Ethernet link to form, the interfaces involved must use the same type of FEC or no FEC.

== 50 Gigabit Ethernet ==
The IEEE P802.3cd standard defines a Physical Coding Sublayer (PCS) in Clause 133, which, after encoding, gives a data rate of 51.5625 Gbit/s. 802.3cd also defines an RS-FEC for forward error correction in Clause 134, which, after FEC encoding, gives a data rate of 53.125 Gbit/s. It is not possible to transmit 53.125 Gbit/s over an electrical interface while maintaining suitable signal integrity, so four-level pulse-amplitude modulation (PAM4) is used to map pairs of bits into a single symbol. This leads to an overall baud rate of 26.5625 GBd for 50 Gbit/s per lane Ethernet. PAM4 encoding for 50G Ethernet is defined in Clause 135 of the 802.3 standard.

Legend for fibre-based PHYs
Fibre type	Introduced	Performance
MMF FDDI 62.5/125 µm	1987	160 MHz·km @ 850 nm
MMF OM1 62.5/125 µm	1989	200 MHz·km @ 850 nm
MMF OM2 50/125 µm	1998	500 MHz·km @ 850 nm
MMF OM3 50/125 µm	2003	1500 MHz·km @ 850 nm
MMF OM4 50/125 µm	2008	3500 MHz·km @ 850 nm
MMF OM5 50/125 µm	2016	3500 MHz·km @ 850 nm and 1850 MHz·km @ 950 nm
SMF OS1 9/125 µm	1998	1.0 dB/km @ 1300/1550 nm
SMF OS2 9/125 µm	2000	0.4 dB/km @ 1300/1550 nm

Name	Standard	Status	Media	Connector	Transceiver module	Reach (m)	# Media (⇆)	# Lambdas (→)	# Lanes (→)	Notes
50 Gigabit Ethernet (50 GbE) – (Data rate: 50 Gbit/s – Line code: 256b/257b × RS-FEC(544,514) × PAM4 – Line rate: 26.5625 GBd – Full-Duplex)
LAUI-2	802.3cd-2018 (CL135B/C)	current	Chip-to-chip/ Chip-to-module interface	—N/a	—N/a	0.25	2	N/A	2	PCBs; Line code: NRZ (no FEC); Line rate: 2x 25.78125 GBd = 51.5625 GBd
50GAUI-2	802.3cd-2018 (CL135D/E)	current	Chip-to-chip/ Chip-to-module interface	—N/a	—N/a	0.25	2	N/A	2	PCBs; Line code: NRZ (FEC encoded); Line rate: 2x 26.5625 GBd = 53.1250 GBd
50GAUI-1	802.3cd-2018 (CL135F/G)	current	Chip-to-chip/ Chip-to-module interface	—N/a	—N/a	0.25	1	N/A	1	PCBs
50GBASE-KR	802.3cd-2018 (CL133/137)	current	Cu-Backplane	—N/a	—N/a	1	1	N/A	1	PCBs; total channel insertion loss ≤ 30 dB at half sampling rate = 13.28125 GHz (Nyquist).
50GBASE-CR	802.3cd-2018 (CL133/136)	current	Twinaxial balanced	QSFP28, microQSFP, QSFP-DD, OSFP (SFF-8635)	QSFP28	3	1	N/A	1	Data centres (in-rack)
50GBASE-SR	802.3cd-2018 (CL133/138)	current	Fibre; 850 nm	LC	QSFP28/SFP56	OM3: 70	2	1	1	
50GBASE-SR	802.3cd-2018 (CL133/138)	current	Fibre; 850 nm	LC	QSFP28/SFP56	OM4: 100	2	1	1	
50GBASE-LR	802.3cd-2018 (CL133/139)	current	Fibre; 1310 nm	LC	QSFP28/SFP56	OS2: 10k	2	1	1	
50GBASE-FR	802.3cd-2018 (CL133/139)	current	Fibre; 1310 nm	LC	QSFP28/SFP56	OS2: 2k	2	1	1	
50GBASE-ER	802.3cn-2019 (CL133/139)	current	Fibre; 1310 nm	LC	QSFP28/SFP56	OS2: 40k	2	1	1	

== Availability ==
As of June 2016, 25 Gigabit Ethernet equipment is available on the market using the SFP28 and QSFP28 transceiver form factors. Direct attach SFP28-to-SFP28 copper cables in 1-, 2-, 3- and 5-meter lengths are available from several manufacturers, and optical transceiver manufacturers have announced 1310 nm "LR" optics intended for reach distances of 2 to 10 km over two strands of standard single-mode fiber, similar to existing 10GBASE-LR optics, as well as 850 nm "SR" optics intended for short reach distances of 100 m over two strands of OM4 multimode fiber, similar to existing 10GBASE-SR optics.

== See also ==
- Ethernet Alliance
