= Frank Effenberger =

American electrical engineer

Frank J. Effenberger
- Citizenship: USA
- Education: Stevens Institute of Technology; University of Rochester; University of Central Florida
- Known for: XG-PON
- Scientific career
- Fields: Passive optical networking; Electrical engineering
- Workplaces: FutureWei Technologies
- Thesis: Signal and noise in sprite detectors (1995)
- Doctoral advisor: Glenn Boreman (Q102036180)

Frank Effenberger is an American electrical engineer. He is currently Vice President and Fellow of Fixed Access Networks at FutureWei Technologies.

Effenberger completed his undergraduate studies in 1988 at Stevens Institute of Technology, where he majored in engineering and engineering physics. He completed a master's degree at University of Rochester's Institute of Optics. He earned a PhD from the University of Central Florida College of Optics and Photonics. His doctoral thesis was titled Signal and noise in sprite detectors. After graduating, he studied passive optical networks (PONs) at Bellcore. In 2000, he served as director of systems engineering at Quantum Bridge Technologies (later Motorola). He became director of FTTX at Huawei in 2006. In 2011, Effenberger and colleagues published a paper describing the world's first field trial of XG-PON.

Since 2009, Effenberger has served as a rapporteur for Q2/15 (WP1/15) on optical systems for fibre access networks in Study Group 15 on optical transport networks and access network infrastructures of the International Telecommunication Union. He chairs the IEEE 802.3cp task force.

Effenberger was elected as a Fellow of the Optical Society (OSA) in 2015. That year, he was additionally named a Fellow of the Institute of Electrical and Electronics Engineers (IEEE) for contributions to passive optical networking standards and technology. He was also honored by the UCF Alumni Association with their Professional Achievement Award.
