= SerDes Framer Interface =

Telecommunications standard

SerDes Framer Interface is a standard for telecommunications abbreviated as SFI. Variants include:

- SFI-4 or SerDes Framer Interface Level 4, a standardized Electrical Interface by the Optical Internetworking Forum (OIF) for connecting a synchronous optical networking (SONET) framer component to an optical serializer/deserializer (SerDes) for Optical Carrier transmission rate OC-192 interfaces at about 10 Gigabits per second.
- SFI-5 or SerDes Framer Interface Level 5, a standardized Electrical Interface by the OIF for connecting a SONET Framer component to an optical SerDes for OC-768, about 40 Gbit/s. Electrically, it consists of 16 pairs of SerDes channels each running at 3.125 Gbit/s which gives an aggregate bandwidth of 50 Gbit/s accommodating up to 25% of Forward Error Correction.

== See also ==
- XFP transceiver
- System Packet Interface
- Common Electrical I/O
