= Yuanqiu Luo =

Chinese-American optical networking engineer

Yuanqiu Luo is a Chinese and American electrical and optical engineer at Futurewei Technologies in New Jersey, where she specializes in the standardization of optical communications networks as director of optical access standards in Futurewei's Standardization & Industry Department.

== Early life and education ==
Luo developed a childhood interest in optics through a toy kaleidoscope. She majored in electrical engineering at Shandong University, receiving a bachelor's degree in 1997 and a master's degree in 2000. Then, she continued her studies at the New Jersey Institute of Technology. Her doctoral dissertation, Dynamic bandwidth management with service differentiation over ethernet passive optical networks, was supervised by Nirwan Ansari.

== Recognition ==
Luo received the IEEE Standards Award in 2011 and again in 2021, and was a 2022 recipient of an IEEE Technical Innovation Award.

She is a Fellow of Optica, elected "for significant contributions to the research and development of optical access networks, particularly the standardization of broadband optical access technologies". She was named to the 2026 class of IEEE Fellows, "for contributions to the standardization of high-speed optical access protocols".
