= Aurora (protocol) =

Link layer communications protocol

The Aurora Protocol is a link layer communications protocol for use on point-to-point serial links. Developed by Xilinx, it is intended for use in high-speed (gigabits/second and more) connections internally in a computer or in an embedded system. It uses either 8b/10b encoding or 64b/66b encoding.
