= Optical Internetworking Forum =

Non-profit organization

The Optical Internetworking Forum (OIF) is a prominent non-profit consortium that was founded in 1998. It promotes the development and deployment of interoperable computer networking products and services through implementation agreements (IAs) for optical networking products and component technologies including SerDes devices.

OIF also creates benchmarks, performs worldwide interoperability testing, builds market awareness and promotes education for optical technologies. The Network Processing Forum merged into OIF in June 2006.

The OIF has around a hundred member companies and has four face-to-face meetings per year. It is managed by Association Management Solutions and operates using parliamentary debate rules and transparent decision making. The technical content is member-driven. The OIF operates under a RAND licensing framework. It maintains liaison relationships with many other standards-developing organizations including the ITU, IEEE 802.3, the ONF, the InfiniBand Trade Association, the TIA and the IETF.

== Organization ==
Implementation agreements are based on requirements developed cooperatively by end users, service providers, equipment vendors and technology providers in alignment with worldwide standards, augmented as necessary. This is accomplished through industry member participation working together to develop specifications for external network element interfaces, software interfaces internal to network elements and hardware component interfaces internal to network elements.

OIF sponsors a technical committee and a market awareness and education committee. The technical committee has the following working groups:

- The Architecture and Signaling Working Group develops agreements related to architecture and signaling from service provider requirements.
- The Carrier Working Group assembles functional requirements and guidelines for optical networking products.
- The Interoperability Working Group defines testing methodologies, carries out proofs of concept, evaluates multi-vendor interoperability and contributes technical leadership for interoperability trials. Test criteria and test methods are defined with support of the source technical working group.
- The Operations, Administration, Maintenance, and Provisioning working group focuses on deployment issues.
- The Physical and Link Layer Working Group develops implementation agreements related to physical and data link layer interfaces between optical internetworking elements and between their internal components.

== Electrical Implementation Agreements ==
=== CEI, the Common Electrical I/O ===
The Common Electrical I/O (CEI) Interoperability Agreement is for 3.125, 6, 11, 25–28, 56 and 112 Gbit/s high speed electrical interfaces. The CEI specification has defined SerDes interfaces for the industry since 2006. The OIF's published CEI 5.0 family of interfaces plus its predecessors are the eighth generation and seventh doubling in rate of high speed electrical interfaces beginning with SPI-3 in 2000. The current generation, CEI-112G defines four reaches of 112 Gbit/s interfaces. CEI has influenced or has been adopted or adapted in many other serial interface standards by many different standards organizations over its long lifetime. SerDes interfaces have been developed based on CEI for most ASIC and FPGA products.

=== Older Electrical interfaces ===
Throughout the 2000s, the OIF produced an important series of interfaces that influenced the development of multiple generations of devices. Beginning with the donation of the PL-3 interface by PMC-Sierra in 2000, the OIF produced the System Packet Interface (SPI) family of packet interfaces. SPI-3 and SPI-4.2 defined two generations of devices before they were supplanted by the closely related Interlaken standard in the SPI-5 generation in 2006.

The OIF also defined the SerDes Framer Interface (SFI) family of specifications in parallel with SPI. As a part of the SPI-5 and SFI-5 development, a common electrical interface was developed termed SxI-5, which laid the groundwork for the highly successful CEI family of Interoperability Agreements.

== Protocol Implementation Agreements ==
=== FlexE - Flexible Ethernet ===
FlexE defines a method of enhancing Ethernet's ability to utilize network bandwidth. It provides aggregation, sub-rating and channelization capabilities. FlexE provides a more bandwidth efficient method of link aggregation than 802.3ad does. FlexE adds a calendar mechanism that leverages the 64b66b framing method of Ethernet to allow TDM-based aggregation, sub-rating and channelization features to be implemented.

=== Multi-Link Gearbox ===
The Multi-link Gearbox (MLG) IA supports a configuration where a link to multiple slower physical interfaces can be supported over a single higher speed interface.

=== Older Protocol interfaces ===
The OIF has published numerous older protocol interfaces including a generic framer interface called CEI-P. The OIF also publishes numerous older IAs of the Network Processing Forum.

== Optical Implementation Agreements and Projects ==
=== 400ZR Project ===
In March 2020, the OIF published the 400ZR Coherent Optical Module Interoperability Agreement. This IA defines a coherent optical module that can be used over either amplified 120 km DWDM channels or shorter non-amplified DWDM channels.

=== Coherent Transceiver Implementation Agreements ===
A major set of IAs has been developed by the OIF from 2010 through the present. These have allowed several generations of coherent interfaces to be developed in an efficient manner by the optical module industry by defining some of the components that fit inside of optical modules. These include IAs for Integrated Polarization Multiplexed Quadrature Modulated Transmitters, Dual Polarization receivers and Integrated Dual Polarization Micro-Intradyne Coherent Receivers.

=== Analog Coherent Optics Implementation Agreement ===
A new style of electrical interface specifically for coherent modules was defined. This replaces the digital interface that modules typically have with an analog interface. This allows a large and power consuming digital signal processor to be placed on the larger card and the coherent optics module to have only analog components. This IA makes use of a CFP2 style module. The first ACO interface IA was for the CFP2 form factor was published in January 2016. The OIF published the more general ACO IA in May 2018.

=== 100G and 400G Frameworks ===
For both the 100G and 400G generations, the OIF produced framework documents that allows industry participants to jointly map out what would IAs and other aspects would be needed to be developed by the industry. In both cases, white papers were produced specific aspects.

=== Tunable Laser Implementation Agreements ===
The OIF has produced several generations of tunable laser IAs including the Micro Integrable Tunable Laser Assembly and the Integrable Tunable Laser Assembly Multi Source Agreement.

=== Common Management Interface Specification ===
In March 2020, the OIF published the CMIS IA, which extends the Common Management Interface Specification [CMIS] to allow management of digital coherent optics modules. This IA defines additional management registers, messages, and monitors, together with new functionality, mechanisms, or behaviors, initially focused on managing 400ZE modules.

=== Older Optical Implementation Agreements ===
The OIF produced an influential series of Very Short Reach Interface IAs in the OC-192 era. These include five IAs that defined the interface and link budgets for parallel optics. The Interoperability for Long Reach and Extended Reach 10 Gbit/s Transponders and Transceivers was also influential in the long reach market.

== Control Plane Implementation Agreements ==
The OIF Architecture and Signaling working group has defined important early interfaces in the development of software-defined networking or SDN. These interfaces are the UNI, User Network Interface and NNI, Network to Network Interface Interoperability Agreements. These allowed carrier data networks to respond in real-time to connection requests from users, delivering bandwidth within moments instead of through traditional deployment methods that might deliver bandwidth after weeks.

Numerous complementary specifications to the UNI and NNI have also been developed. These include Call Detail Record, Security Extension, and Control Plane Logging and Auditing IAs. IAs to assist in the deployment of large networks have been developed including External Network-Network Interface (E-NNI) OSPF-based Routing and Control Plane Requirements for Multi-Domain Optical Transport Networks.

== Interoperability Demonstrations ==
=== Optical, Electrical and Protocol Interop Demonstrations ===
The OIF has held many interoperability demonstrations over the years, typically at the Optical Fiber Conference (OFC) and/or ECOC trade shows. Recent demonstrations have included multi-vendor interoperation for several of the CEI-56G reaches, CEI-112G VSR links, the CFP2-ACO interface, and FlexE.

== Compliance Testing ==
A compliance program for several of the OIFs control place interfaces was initiated in 2016. Major compliance tests with multiple vendors were held in the labs of multiple carriers in 2017, 2018 and 2020.
