= Interlaken (networking) =

Interlaken is a royalty-free interconnect protocol.

It was invented by Cisco Systems and Cortina Systems in 2006, optimized for high-bandwidth and reliable packet transfers. It builds on the channelization and per channel flow control features of SPI-4.2, while reducing the number of integrated circuit (chip) I/O pins by using high speed SerDes technology. Bundles of serial links create a logical connection between components with multiple channels, backpressure capability, and data-integrity protection to boost the performance of communications equipment. Interlaken manages speeds of up to 6 Gbit/s per pin (lane) and large numbers of lanes can form an Interlaken interface. It was designed to handle high-speed (10 Gigabit Ethernet, 100 Gigabit Ethernet and beyond) computer network connections.

An alliance was formed in 2007.

Xilinx and Intel have both developed FPGAs that have Interlaken hard IP built in.
