= IEEE 802.3 =

Collection of standards for wired Ethernet

IEEE 802.3 is a working group and a collection of standards defining the physical layer and data link layer's media access control (MAC) of wired Ethernet. The standards are produced by the working group of the Institute of Electrical and Electronics Engineers (IEEE). This set of standards generally applies to local area networks (LANs) and metropolitan area networks. It also has some applications to access networks and wide area network (WAN) applications. The international standard IEEE/ISO/IEC 8802-3-2021 was adopted from 802.3-2018.

Physical connections are made between network nodes and, usually, various network infrastructure devices (hubs, switches, routers) by various types of copper cables or optical fiber.

802.3 standards support the IEEE 802.1 network architecture.

802.3 also defines a LAN medium access control method using carrier-sense multiple access with collision detection (CSMA/CD).

== Communication standards ==
The IEEE 802 Local and Metropolitan Area Networks Committee was formed in 1980 to create a single standard for the lower layers of a local or metropolitan area network. At the time, there were three approaches to local area networking: IBM’s token ring, the DEC-Intel-Xerox Ethernet, and the token bus. Because the group could not agree on a single approach, three working groups were formed, 802.3 for Ethernet (called CSMA/CD), 802.4 for token bus, and 802.5 for token ring. An Ethernet network had already been implemented at Xerox Parc to connect Alto computers to a laser printer in 1973. In 1980, Digital, Intel, and Xerox published a standard called the DIX standard. In 1982, they published a second version. The first IEEE Standard for the CSMA/CD approach was based on the DIX standard. The original IEEE standard for Ethernet was named "IEEE Standards for Local Area Networks: Carrier Sense Multiple Access with Collision Detection (CSMA/CD) Access Method and Physical Layer Specifications” and subsequent standards were named similarly, until 2012 when it became simply “Standard for Ethernet”. This was because of sensitivities around using a commercial product as the basis for a standard.

Ethernet standard	IEEE approval date	Description
802.3-1985	1983-06	10BASE5 10 Mbit/s (1.25 MB/s) over thick coax. First edition of the IEEE 802.3 standard. Approved by IEEE in 1983, approved by ANSI in 1984, and published in 1985. Same as Ethernet II (above) except Type field is replaced by Length, and an 802.2 LLC header follows the 802.3 header. Based on the CSMA/CD media access method.
802.3a	1985-11	10BASE2 10 Mbit/s (1.25 MB/s) over thin coax (a.k.a. thinnet or cheapernet)
802.3b	1985-09	10BROAD36
802.3c	1985-12	10 Mbit/s (1.25 MB/s) repeater specifications
802.3d	1987-12	Fiber-optic inter-repeater link
802.3e	1987-06	1BASE5 or StarLAN, first use of (voice-grade) twisted pair cabling, 1 Mbit/s, maximum reach of 250 to 500 m
802.3h	1990-09	10 Mbit/s layer management, DTEs
802.3i	1990-09	10BASE-T 10 Mbit/s (1.25 MB/s) over twisted pair
802.3j	1992-09	10BASE-F 10 Mbit/s (1.25 MB/s) over optical fiber
802.3k	1992-09	10 Mbit/s layer management, repeaters
802.3m	1995-09	Maintenance
802.3n	1995-09	Maintenance
802.3q	1993-06	GDMO (ISO/IEC 10165-4) format for Layer Managed Objects
802.3r	1996-07	10BASE5 Medium Attachment Unit PICS
802.3s	1995-09	Maintenance
802.3t	1995-06	120 Ω informative annex for 10BASE-T
802.3u	1995-06	100BASE-TX, 100BASE-T4, 100BASE-FX Fast Ethernet at 100 Mbit/s (12.5 MB/s) with autonegotiation
802.3v	1995-12	150 Ω informative annex for 10BASE-T
802.3x	1997-03	Full duplex and flow control; also incorporates DIX framing, so there's no longer a DIX/802.3 split
802.3y	1997-03	100BASE-T2 100 Mbit/s (12.5 MB/s) over voice-grade twisted pair
802.3z	1998-06	1000BASE-X 1 Gbit/s (125 MB/s) Ethernet over optical fiber
802.3-1998	1998-06	(802.3aa) A revision of the base standard incorporating earlier amendments and errata
802.3ab	1999-06	1000BASE-T 1 Gbit/s (125 MB/s) Ethernet over twisted pair
802.3ac	1998-09	Max frame size extended to 1522 bytes to allow inclusion of a Q-tag. The Q-tag includes 802.1Q VLAN information and 802.1p priority information.
802.3ad	2000-03	Link aggregation for parallel links, since moved to IEEE 802.1AX
802.3-2002	2002-01	(802.3ag) A revision of the base standard incorporating the three prior amendments and errata
802.3ae	2002-06	10 Gigabit Ethernet over fiber: 10GBASE-SR, 10GBASE-LR, 10GBASE-ER, 10GBASE-SW, 10GBASE-LW, 10GBASE-EW
802.3af	2003-06	Power over Ethernet (15.4 W)
802.3ah	2004-06	Ethernet in the first mile
802.3ak	2004-02	10GBASE-CX4 10 Gbit/s (1,250 MB/s) Ethernet over twinaxial cables
802.3-2005	2005-06	(802.3am) A revision of the base standard incorporating the four prior amendments and errata
802.3an	2006-06	10GBASE-T 10 Gbit/s (1,250 MB/s) Ethernet over unshielded twisted pair (UTP)
802.3ap	2007-03	Backplane Ethernet (1 and 10 Gbit/s (125 and 1,250 MB/s) over printed circuit boards)
802.3aq	2006-09	10GBASE-LRM 10 Gbit/s (1,250 MB/s) Ethernet over multimode fiber
P802.3ar	canceled	Congestion management (withdrawn)
802.3as	2006-09	Frame expansion
802.3at	2009-09	Power over Ethernet enhancements (25.5 W)
802.3au	2006-06	Isolation requirements for Power over Ethernet (802.3-2005/Cor 1)
802.3av	2009-09	10 Gbit/s EPON
802.3aw	2007-06	Fixed an equation in the publication of 10GBASE-T (released as 802.3-2005/Cor 2)
802.3ax	2008-11	Link aggregation – moved to and approved as 802.1AX
802.3-2008	2008-12	(802.3ay) A revision of the base standard incorporating the 802.3an/ap/aq/as amendments, two corrigenda and errata
802.3az	2010-09	Energy-Efficient Ethernet
802.3ba	2010-06	40 Gbit/s and 100 Gbit/s Ethernet. 40 Gbit/s over a 1 m backplane, 10 m Cu cable assembly (4×25 Gbit/s or 10×10 Gbit/s lanes) and 100 m of multi-mode optical fiber, and 100 Gbit/s over 10 m of Cu cable assembly, 100 m of multi-mode optical fiber and 40 km of single-mode optical fiber
802.3-2008/Cor 1	2009-12	(802.3bb) Increase Pause Reaction Delay timings which are insufficient for 10 Gbit/s (Working group name was 802.3bb.)
802.3bc	2009-09	Move and update Ethernet-related TLVs (type, length, values), previously specified in Annex F of IEEE 802.1AB (LLDP) to 802.3
802.3bd	2011-06	Priority-based Flow Control. An amendment by the IEEE 802.1 Data Center Bridging Task Group (802.1Qbb) to develop an amendment to IEEE Std 802.3 to add a MAC Control Frame to support IEEE 802.1Qbb Priority-based Flow Control.
802.3.1	2011-05	(802.3be) MIB definitions for Ethernet. It consolidates the Ethernet-related MIBs present in Annex 30A&B, various IETF RFCs, and 802.1AB annex F into one master document with a machine-readable extract. (Working group name was P802.3be.)
802.3bf	2011-05	Provides an accurate indication of the transmission and reception initiation times of certain packets as required to support IEEE P802.1AS
802.3bg	2011-03	Provide a 40 Gbit/s PMD which is optically compatible with existing carrier SMF 40 Gbit/s client interfaces (OTU3/STM-256/OC-768/40G POS).
802.3-2012	2012-08	(802.3bh) A revision of the base standard incorporating the 802.3at/av/az/ba/bc/bd/bf/bg amendments, corrigenda and errata.
802.3bj	2014-06	Defines a four-lane 100 Gbit/s backplane PHY for operation over links consistent with copper traces on "improved FR-4" (as defined by IEEE P802.3ap or better materials to be defined by the Task Force) with lengths up to at least 1 m and a four-lane 100 Gbit/s PHY for operation over links consistent with copper twinaxial cables with lengths up to at least 5 m.
802.3bk	2013-08	This amendment to IEEE Std 802.3 defines the physical-layer specifications and management parameters for EPON operation on point-to-multipoint passive optical networks supporting extended power budget classes of PX30, PX40, PRX40, and PR40 PMDs.
802.3bm	2015-02	100G/40G Ethernet for optical fiber
802.3bn	2016-09	10G-EPON and 10GPASS-XR, passive optical networks over coax
802.3bp	2016-06	1000BASE-T1 – Gigabit Ethernet over a single twisted pair for automotive & industrial environments
802.3bq	2016-06	25GBASE-T/40GBASE-T Ethernet for four-pair balanced–twisted-pair cabling with two connectors over 30 m distances
802.3br	2016-06	Specification and Management Parameters for Interspersing Express Traffic
802.3bs	2017-12	200GbE (200 Gbit/s) over single-mode fiber and 400GbE (400 Gbit/s) over optical physical media
802.3bt	2018-09	Third generation Power over Ethernet with up to 100 W using four pairs in balanced–twisted-pair cabling (4PPoE), including 10GBASE-T, lower standby power and specific enhancements to support IoT applications (e.g. lighting, sensors, building automation).
802.3bu	2016-12	Power over Data Lines (PoDL) for single twisted pair Ethernet (100BASE-T1)
802.3bv	2017-02	Gigabit Ethernet over plastic optical fiber (POF)
802.3bw	2015-10	100BASE-T1 – 100 Mbit/s Ethernet over a single twisted pair for automotive applications
802.3-2015	2015-09	802.3bx – A new consolidated revision of the 802.3 standard including amendments 802.3bk/bj/bm
802.3by	2016-06	Optical fiber, twinax and backplane 25 Gigabit Ethernet
802.3bz	2016-09	2.5GBASE-T and 5GBASE-T – 2.5 Gbit/s and 5 Gbit/s Ethernet over Cat-5e/Cat-6 twisted-pair cable
802.3ca	2020-06	25G-EPON and 50G-EPON – Downstream/Upstream rates of 25/10, 25/25, 50/10, 50/25, 50/50 Gbit/s over Ethernet Passive Optical Networks
802.3cb	2018-09	2.5 Gbit/s and 5 Gbit/s Operation over Backplane
802.3cc	2017-12	25 Gbit/s over Single-Mode Fiber
802.3cd	2018-12	Media Access Control Parameters for 50 Gbit/s and Physical Layers and Management Parameters for 50, 100, and 200 Gbit/s Operation
802.3ce	2017-03	Multilane Timestamping
802.3.2-2019	2019-03	802.3cf, YANG Data Model Definitions
802.3cg	2019-11	10BASE-T1L and 10BASE-T1S – 10 Mbit/s Single–twisted-pair Ethernet
802.3ch	2020-06	MultiGigBASE-T1 Automotive Ethernet (2.5, 5, 10 Gbit/s) over 15 m with optional PoDL
802.3-2018	2018-08	802.3cj – 802.3-2015 maintenance, incorporating recent amendments bn/bp/bq/br/bs/bu/bv/bw/by/bz/cc/ce
802.3ck	2022-09	100, 200, and 400 Gbit/s Ethernet using 100 Gbit/s lanes, chaired by Beth Kochuparambil
802.3cm	2020-01	400 Gbit/s over multimode fiber (four and eight pairs, 100 m)
802.3cn	2019-11	50 Gbit/s (40 km), 100 Gbit/s (80 km), 200 Gbit/s (four λ, 40 km), and 400 Gbit/s (eight λ, 40 km and single λ, 80 km over DWDM) over single-mode fiber and DWDM
802.3cp	2021-06	10/25/50 Gbit/s single-strand optical access with at least 10/20/40 km reach, chaired by Frank Effenberger
802.3cq	2020-01	Power over Ethernet over two pairs (maintenance)
802.3cr	2021-02	Isolation (maintenance)
802.3cs	2022-09	"Super-PON" – Increased-reach, 10 Gbit/s optical access with at least 50 km reach and 1:64 split ratio per wavelength pair, 16 wavelength pairs, chaired by Claudio DeSanti
802.3ct	2021-06	100 Gbit/s over DWDM systems (80 km reach using coherent modulation), chaired by John D'Ambrosia
802.3cu	2021-02	100 Gbit/s and 400 Gbit/s over SMF using 100 Gbit/s lanes
802.3cv	2021-05	Power over Ethernet maintenance, chaired by Chad Jones
802.3cw	canceled	400 Gbit/s over DWDM Systems – chaired by John D'Ambrosia, withdrawn
802.3cx	2023-03	Improved PTP time-stamping accuracy, chaired by Steve Gorshe
802.3cy	2023-06	25GBASE-T1 25 Gbit/s electrical automotive Ethernet, chaired by Steve Carlson
802.3cz	2023-03	Multi-gigabit optical automotive Ethernet, chaired by Bob Grow
802.3da	2026-03	10BASE-T1M 10 Mb/s operation over single–balanced-pair multi-drop segments, extends length to at least 50 m and at least 16 nodes – chaired by Chad Jones
802.3db	2022-09	100 Gbit/s, 200 Gbit/s, and 400 Gbit/s operation over optical fiber using 100 Gbit/s signaling, chaired by Robert Lingle
802.3-2022	2022-07	802.3dc – 802.3-2018 maintenance, incorporating recent amendments bt/ca/cb/cd/cg/ch/cm/cn/cp/cq/cr/ct/cu/cv, chaired by Adam Healey
802.3dd	2022-06	Power over Data Lines of single-pair Ethernet maintenance, chaired by George Zimmerman
802.3de	2022-09	Time synchronization for point-to-point single-pair Ethernet, chaired by George Zimmerman
802.3df	2024-02	200 Gb/s, 400 Gb/s and 800 Gb/s using 100 Gbit/s lanes, chaired by John D’Ambrosia
802.3dg	2026-06	100BASE-T1L (100 Mbps over a single pair with extended length to 500 m) – scheduled for mid 2026, chaired by George Zimmerman
802.3dh	canceled	Multi-gigabit-per-second automotive Ethernet over plastic optical fiber, chaired by Yuji Watanabe
802.3dj	(TBD)	200 Gb/s, 400 Gb/s, 800 Gb/s and 1.6 Tbit/s using 200 Gbit/s lanes – scheduled for fall 2026, chaired by John D'Ambrosia. Also known as "Ultra Ethernet" in the version promoted by the Ultra Ethernet Consortium. UALink is based on its PHY.
802.3dk	2026-03	Greater than 50 Gbit/s bidirectional optical access, scheduled for fall 2026, chaired by Yuanqiu Luo
802.3dm	(TBD)	Asymmetrical Electrical Automotive Ethernet, scheduled for fall 2026
802.3dn	2024-09	802.3-2022/Cor 1 Multi-Gigabit Automotive MDI Return Loss, chaired by Brett McClellan
802.3dp	(TBD)	Cabling Restrictions for Single Pair Power over Ethernet Task Force
802.3dq	(TBD)	Pin-Optimized PHY Interface
802.3dr	(TBD)	802.3-2022/Cor 2 Optical Automotive Ethernet TDFOM Task Force
802.3ds	(TBD)	200 Gbit/s per wavelength MMF PHYs with 200/400/800/1600 Gbit/s overall and 30 or 50 m reach, scheduled for late 2027
802.3dt	(TBD)	Ethernet Metadata Services
802.3du	(TBD)	802.3-2022 maintenance, incorporating previous amendments

== See also ==
- IEEE 802
- IEEE 802.11, a set of wireless networking standards
- IEEE 802.16, a set of WiMAX standards
- IEEE Standards Association
