= Optical Carrier transmission rates =

Standardized set of specifications

Optical Carrier transmission rates are a standardized set of specifications of transmission bandwidth for digital signals that can be carried on Synchronous Optical Networking (SONET) fiber optic networks. Transmission rates are defined by rate of the bitstream of the digital signal and are designated by hyphenation of the acronym OC and an integer value of the multiple of the basic unit of rate, e.g., OC-48. The base unit is 51.84 Mbit/s. Thus, the speed of optical-carrier-classified lines labeled as OC-n is n × 51.84 Mbit/s.

== Optical Carrier specifications ==
Optical Carrier classifications are based on the abbreviation OC followed by a number specifying a multiple of 51.84 Mbit/s: n × 51.84 Mbit/s => OC-n. For example, an OC-3 transmission medium has 3 times the transmission capacity of OC-1.

=== OC-1 ===
OC-1 is a SONET line with transmission speeds of up to 51.84 Mbit/s (payload: 50.112 Mbit/s; overhead: 1.728 Mbit/s) using optical fiber.

=== OC-3 ===
OC-3 is a network line with transmission data rate of up to 155.52 Mbit/s (payload: 148.608 Mbit/s; overhead: 6.912 Mbit/s, including path overhead) using fiber optics. Depending on the system OC-3 is also known as STS-3 (electrical level) and STM-1 (SDH).

=== OC-3c / STM-1 ===
OC-3c (c stands for "concatenated") concatenates three STS-1 (OC-1) frames into a single OC-3 look alike stream. The three STS-1 (OC-1) streams interleave with each other so that the first column is from the first stream, the second column is from the second stream, and the third is from the third stream. Concatenated STS (OC) frames carry only one column of path overhead because they cannot be divided into finer granularity signals. Hence, OC-3c can transmit more payload to accommodate a CEPT-4 139.264 Mbit/s signal. The payload rate is 149.76 Mbit/s and overhead is 5.76 Mbit/s.

=== OC-12 / STM-4 ===
OC-12 is a network line with transmission speeds of up to 622.08 Mbit/s (payload: 601.344 Mbit/s; overhead: 20.736 Mbit/s).

OC-12 lines were commonly used by ISPs as wide area network (WAN) connections, or connecting xDSL customers to a larger internal network

This connection speed was popular with mid-sized (below Tier 2) internet customers, such as web hosting companies or smaller ISPs buying service from larger ones.

=== OC-24 ===
OC-24 is a network line with transmission speeds of up to 1244.16 Mbit/s (payload: 1202.208 Mbit/s (1.202208 Gbit/s); overhead: 41.472 Mbit/s). Implementations of OC-24 in commercial deployments are rare.

=== OC-48 / STM-16 / 2.5G SONET ===
OC-48 is a network line with transmission speeds of up to 2488.32 Mbit/s (payload: 2405.376 Mbit/s (2.405376 Gbit/s); overhead: 82.944 Mbit/s).

With relatively low interface prices, with being faster than OC-3 and OC-12 connections, and even surpassing gigabit Ethernet, OC-48 connections are used as the backbones of many regional ISPs. Interconnections between large ISPs for purposes of peering or transit are quite common. As of 2005, the only connections in widespread use that surpass OC-48 speeds are OC-192 and 10 Gigabit Ethernet.

OC-48 is also used as a transmission speed for tributaries from OC-192 nodes in order to optimize card slot utilization where lower speed deployments are used. Slower cards that drop to OC-12, OC-3 or STS-1 speeds are more commonly found on OC-48 terminals, where use of these cards on an OC-192 terminal would not allow for full use of the available bandwidth due to the number of cards that would be required.

=== OC-192 / STM-64 / 10G SONET ===
OC-192 is a network line with transmission speeds of up to 9953.28 Mbit/s (payload: 9510.912 Mbit/s (9.510912 Gbit/s); overhead: 442.368 Mbit/s).

A standardized variant of 10 Gigabit Ethernet, called WAN PHY, is designed to inter-operate with OC-192 transport equipment while the common version of 10 Gigabit Ethernet is called LAN PHY (which is not compatible with OC-192 transport equipment in its native form). The naming is somewhat misleading, because both variants can be used on a wide area network.

=== OC-768 / STM-256 / 40G SONET ===
OC-768 is a network line with transmission speeds of up to 39,813.12 Mbit/s (payload: 38,486.016 Mbit/s (38.486016 Gbit/s); overhead: 1,327.104 Mbit/s (1.327104 Gbit/s)).

On October 23, 2008, AT&T announced the completion of upgrades to OC-768 on 80,000 fiber-optic wavelength miles of their IP/MPLS backbone network. OC-768 SONET interfaces have been available with short-reach optical interfaces from Cisco since 2006. Infinera made a field trial demonstration data transmission on a live production network involving the service transmission of a 40 Gbit/s OC-768/STM-256 service over a 1,969 km terrestrial network spanning Europe and the U.S. In November 2008, an OC-768 connection was successfully brought up on the TAT-14/SeaGirt transatlantic cable, the longest hop being 7,500 km.

=== OC-3072 / STM-1024 / 160G SONET ===
OC-3072 is a network interface with transmission speeds of 159,252 Mbit/s (payload 153,944.064 Mbit/s).

=== OC-12288 / STM-4096 / 640G SONET ===
OC-12288 is a network interface with transmission speeds of 637,009.92 Mbit/s.

== See also ==
- Optical transport network
