= PMC-Sierra =

Former semiconductor company

- Type: Public
- Traded as: Nasdaq: PMCS
- Industry: Fabless semiconductor company
- Founded: January 11, 1984; 42 years ago
- Defunct: January 15, 2016; 10 years ago
- Fate: Acquired by Microsemi
- Headquarters: Sunnyvale, California, United States
- Key people: Greg Lang (CEO)
- Number of employees: 1,500
- Website: pmcs.com

PMC-Sierra was a global fabless semiconductor company with offices worldwide that developed and sold semiconductor devices into the storage, communications, optical networking, printing, and embedded computing marketplaces.

On January 15, 2016, Microsemi Corporation completed the acquisition of PMC-Sierra through Microsemi's subsidiary Lois Acquisition and Microchip Technology completed the acquisition of Microsemi on May 29, 2018.

== History ==
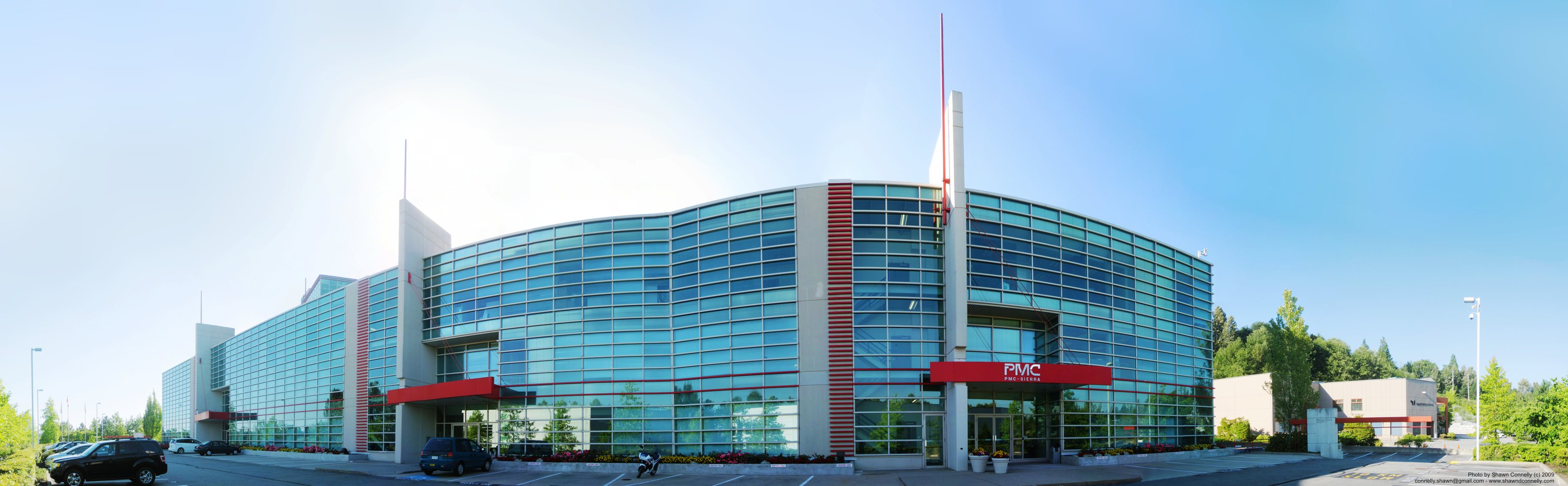
Burnaby, Canada PMC-Sierra Building

Sierra Semiconductor was founded in 1984 in San Jose, California by James Diller. It received funding on January 11, 1984 from Sequoia Capital, and went public in 1991.

Pacific Microelectronics Centre (PMC) in Burnaby, British Columbia, Canada, was spun off from Microtel Pacific Research (the research arm of BC TEL at the time) to develop Asynchronous Transfer Mode (ATM) and later SONET integrated circuits (chips). With investment from Sierra Semiconductor, PMC was established in 1992 as a private company focused on providing networking semiconductors, and became a wholly owned, independently operated subsidiary of Sierra Semiconductor in 1994. Microtel is part of Verizon Communications.

In 1995, using ideas from UBC Electrical Engineering students, PMC revolutionized the optical networking chipset market with the first OC-12 (622 Mbit/s) S/UNI transceiver chips. This circuit-design breakthrough put the company 3 years ahead of Bell Labs in its optical transceiver development.

In August 1996, Sierra Semiconductor announced its decision to exit the personal computer modem chipset business, to restructure its other non-networking products and focus on its networking products. 150 employees were made redundant. In late 1996, it acquired Bipolar Integrated Technology in Beaverton, Oregon, for about $10 million to enter the Ethernet business. The headquarters was moved to Burnaby, and in June 1997, PMC Sierra overtook its parent, Sierra Semiconductor, changing its name to PMC-Sierra. It acquired Integrated Telecom Technology Inc., San Jose, for $55 million in cash and stock in 1998.

Between 2001 and 2015 the company had multiple rounds of layoffs. In 2001, 350 employees, or 24% of the total workforce, were laid off. Then in January 2003, 176 employees were laid off and in June 2005, 89 employees were laid off. In August 2006, 30 to 40 employees were laid off. In 2007 two rounds of layoffs happened, first in March 2007, 175 employees were laid off and then in December 2007, 18 employees were laid off. In July 2015, roughly 200 employees were laid off as part of a restructuring measure.

In May 2006, PMC-Sierra acquired Passave, Inc., a developer of system-on-chip semiconductors for the fiber to the home access market in a stock-for-stock transaction valued at approximately $300 million. Passave was headquartered in Boston and had a development center in Tel Aviv, Israel. On October 22, 2010, PMC-Sierra acquired Wintegra Inc. for $240 million. Wintegra had 165 employees with the majority of its development team located in Raanana, Israel, and Austin, Texas. A further acquisition was made on the 29th of May 2013 when PMC acquired IDT's Enterprise Flash Controller Business.

During the fall of 2015, both Skyworks Solutions and Microsemi were attempting to acquire PMC-Sierra. On November 24, 2015, Microsemi announced that it had entered into an agreement to acquire PMC-Sierra.

== Technology ==
PMC-Sierra provided broadband communications and storage semiconductors for metro, access, fiber to the home, wireless infrastructure, enterprise and channel storage, laser printers and customer premises equipment. PMC had more than 250 different semiconductor devices that were sold to equipment manufacturers, who in turn supplied their equipment to communications network service providers and enterprises. As a fabless semiconductor company, PMC-Sierra designed and tested products, with wafer fabrication and assembly outsourced functions to third party suppliers.

PMC-Sierra's customers included HP, EMC Corporation, Huawei, Cisco, Alcatel-Lucent, Fujitsu, Hitachi, Mitsubishi, ZTE and Juniper.

=== Storage ===
PMC-Sierra offered products for storage networks and systems. The company provided an interconnect and controller product family for SAS and SATA storage systems and server computer RAID controllers. PMC-Sierra provided Fibre Channel controller and system interconnect products. PMC-Sierra acquired the channel storage business from Adaptec. This business was named "Adaptec by PMC" and made SAS/SATA RAID Adapters. In July 2013 PMC completed the acquisition of IDT's Flash controller business and in August 2014 introduced the Flashtec line of non-volatile memory drives.

=== Communications ===
PMC-Sierra offered communication ICs for metro access, metro transport, FTTH/PON, Ethernet over SONET/SDH, Optical Transport Network (OTN) and wireless base transceiver stations (BTS). PMC-Sierra sold products for what is known as Ethernet in the first mile, which generally uses a passive optical network to residential areas. PMC-Sierra semiconductor devices allowed wireless service providers to deploy wireless mobile phone network equipment. This included MIPS-based network processors for wireless back haul and radio frequency integrated circuits for wideband radio modules. The company's UniTRX chipsets were highly integrated, low-power RFICs for wideband radio modules that operated in the 400 MHz to 4 GHz frequency range. These solutions addressed the performance requirements of 3GPP and 3GPP2 macro base station radio transceivers with support of multiple standards such as MC-GSM, cdma2000®, WCDMA, and LTE.

The company's DIGI-G4 chipset was PMC's latest OTN processor, and it enabled the transition to 400G line cards in OTN switched metro networks. It is the industry's densest single-chip 4x100G OTN processor with 50 percent less power per port. In March 2015 the PMC DIGI-G4 OTN processor was awarded a Lightwave Innovation Award with the judges citing "...substantial new features, technologies, and capabilities included in the upgrade..."

=== Printers ===
PMC-Sierra has discrete and system-on-chip products for both laser and multi-function printers.
