= Active cable =

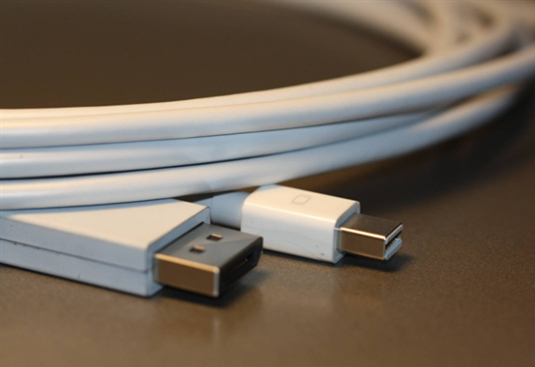
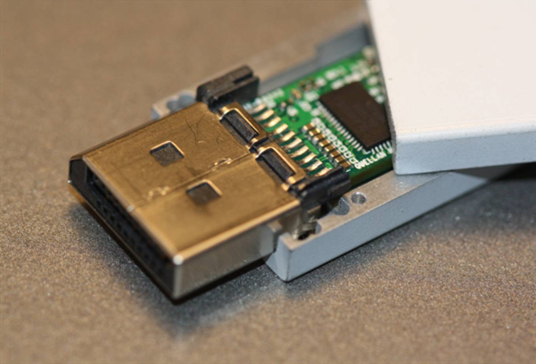
Active DisplayPort cable (top) and the connector with an equalizer chip (bottom)

Active cables are copper or fiber-optic cables used for data transmission that use an electronic circuit to boost their performance. Without an electronic circuit, a cable is considered passive. Unlike passive cables, which can suffer from data degradation due to issues such as attenuation, crosstalk, and group velocity distortion, active cables contain one or more integrated circuits to address these problems. This active boosting allows cables to be more compact, thinner, and longer, and to transmit data faster than passive cables.

Active cables are used in enterprise networks to connect consumer devices such as cameras, gaming consoles, and HDTVs.

Embedding circuitry in cables can allow less copper to be used in cable production while retaining performance. This reduces weight and offers longer reach and lower power consumption. Active cables use one or more integrated circuits to boost the signal passing through the cable. This helps to compensate for issues that can degrade data, such as attenuation, crosstalk, and group velocity distortion. There are two main types of active cables: active electrical cable (AEC), which utilize copper, and active optical cable (AOC), which utilize fiber-optics. Both types have pluggable transceivers that are permanently connected to multiple strands of copper or fiber cable. Passive cables are copper cables that do not have an electronic circuit and are prone to data degradation. Passive cables are also typically bi-directional, while active cables that convert a signal usually only work in one direction. There are two main types of signal conditioning used in active electrical cables: re-driver-based and re-timer. Re-driver-based AECs use a simpler signal amplification, while re-timer AECs use a clock and data recovery (CDR) based signal conditioning.

== Consumer electronics ==
Active cables are used with products such as smartphones, HDTVs, gaming consoles, and DV cameras. DisplayPort is the latest consumer electronics standard to support active cables by allocating power supply pins inside the connector. Enabling ultra-thin (32 AWG and thinner) and long-reach interconnects, which are particularly valuable for use with the miniature Mini DisplayPort form factor.

== Enterprise and storage applications ==
Active cables are used in enterprise and storage applications, where space and air-flow requirements in data centers are considerations. The thinner gauge of active cables allows for a tighter bend radius, which helps facilitate cable management and airflow.

As of 2010, half of the SFP+ interconnect volume are active cables (as opposed to passive copper cables and optical transceiver modules). In addition to this, the advent of QSFP (Quad SFP) interconnects for 40 Gigabit Ethernet and InfiniBand has led to increased use of active cables in this form factor.

== Standards ==
- InfiniBand
- Serial Attached SCSI (SAS)
- DisplayPort
- PCI Express
- HDMI
- USB
- Thunderbolt

== Criticism ==
Some critics of active cable technology criticize the fact that the electronics in an active cable design could be placed inside the connected devices instead, and an inexpensive passive cable used to connect the devices. Digital alternatives to using analogue equalizers and impedance-matching circuits to improve cable performance also exist, such as channel estimation or link adaptation.

Another criticism of active cables is that manufacturers may patent the electronics inside an active cable or even utilize on-chip cryptography to prevent competitors or consumers from producing their replacement cables, and therefore enable manufacturers to monopolize the market for cables and charge consumers higher prices. Active cables are typically priced 5 to 10 times higher than passive cables. Some active cables are only produced by a single manufacturer and sold through a single distributor.

Some critics argue that active cables do not provide power savings for signal processing reasons; in an active cable design, there is at least one extra integrated circuit (IC) compared to passive cable designs. This extra IC must be powered separately when, in a passive cable design, the signal processing can be integrated onto a single chip.

== See also ==
- 10 Gigabit Ethernet
- 100 Gigabit Ethernet
- C form-factor pluggable
- Cloud computing
- CXP (connector)
- Data center
- Fiber-optic communication
- Fibre Channel
- Green computing
- HDMI
- High-performance computing
- Interconnect bottleneck
- List of device bandwidths
- Optical cable
- Optical communication
- Optical link
- Optoelectronics
- Parallel optical interface
- PCI Express
- Terabit Ethernet
- Thunderbolt
