= Optical link =

An optical link is a telecommunications link that consists of a single end-to-end optical circuit. A cable of optical fibers, possibly concatenated into a dark fiber link, is the simplest form of an optical link.

Other forms of optical link can include single-"colour" links over a wavelength-division multiplexing infrastructure, and/or links that use optical amplifiers to compensate for attenuation over long distances.

Other forms of optical links include free-space optical telecommunication links.

In the rail transport sector, optical links are used in two forms depending on whether the feeding station is a main station or not. Thus main stations are called 'long halls', and all remaining stations are said to be 'short halls'.

== See also ==
- 100 Gigabit Ethernet
- 10 Gigabit Ethernet
- Active cable
- Cloud computing
- CXP (connector)
- C form-factor pluggable
- Data center
- Fibre channel
- Fiber-optic communication
- Green computing
- HDMI
- High-performance computing
- InfiniBand
- InfiniBand Trade Association
- Interconnect bottleneck
- Light Peak
- List of device bandwidths
- Optical communication
- Optical cable
- Optoelectronics
- Parallel optical interface
- Photo diode
- PIN diode
- PCI Express
- Small form-factor pluggable
- Terabit Ethernet
- Transimpedance amplifier
- VCSEL
