= Takashi Hasegawa =

Japanese engineer

Takashi Hasegawa is an electrical engineer and programmer, who works at the Optoelectronic System Laboratory of Hitachi Cable, Ltd.

Hasegawa graduated with a Ph.D. in electrical engineering from Nagoya University. As a student, he created MLVWM, or Macintosh-Like Virtual Window Manager and released the code to the public back in 1998.

He was one of five developers who created the 10 Gigabit Ethernet Media Converter, in support of 10GEA's effort to standardize 10 Gigabit Ethernet.
