= CXP =

CXP may refer to:

== Airports ==
- Carson Airport (FAA: CXP), an airport in Carson City, Nevada
- Tunggul Wulung Airport (IATA: CXP), in Central Java
- Xtra Airways (ICAO: CXP), an American ultra low-cost carrier

== Other uses ==
- CXP (connector), an electrical connector used for Infiniband and Ethernet
- CoaXPress, a high speed serial data interface over coaxial cable
- Constellation Program (abbreviated CxP), NASA's cancelled crewed space flight program
- Corporate Express, an office products company
- CXP Rims, a brand of bicycle rims made by Mavic
- The conventional CXP Series of Mack Trucks products
