= Macintosh-Like Virtual Window Manager =

Classic Mac OS styled Window Manager for X11

Macintosh-like Virtual Window Manager
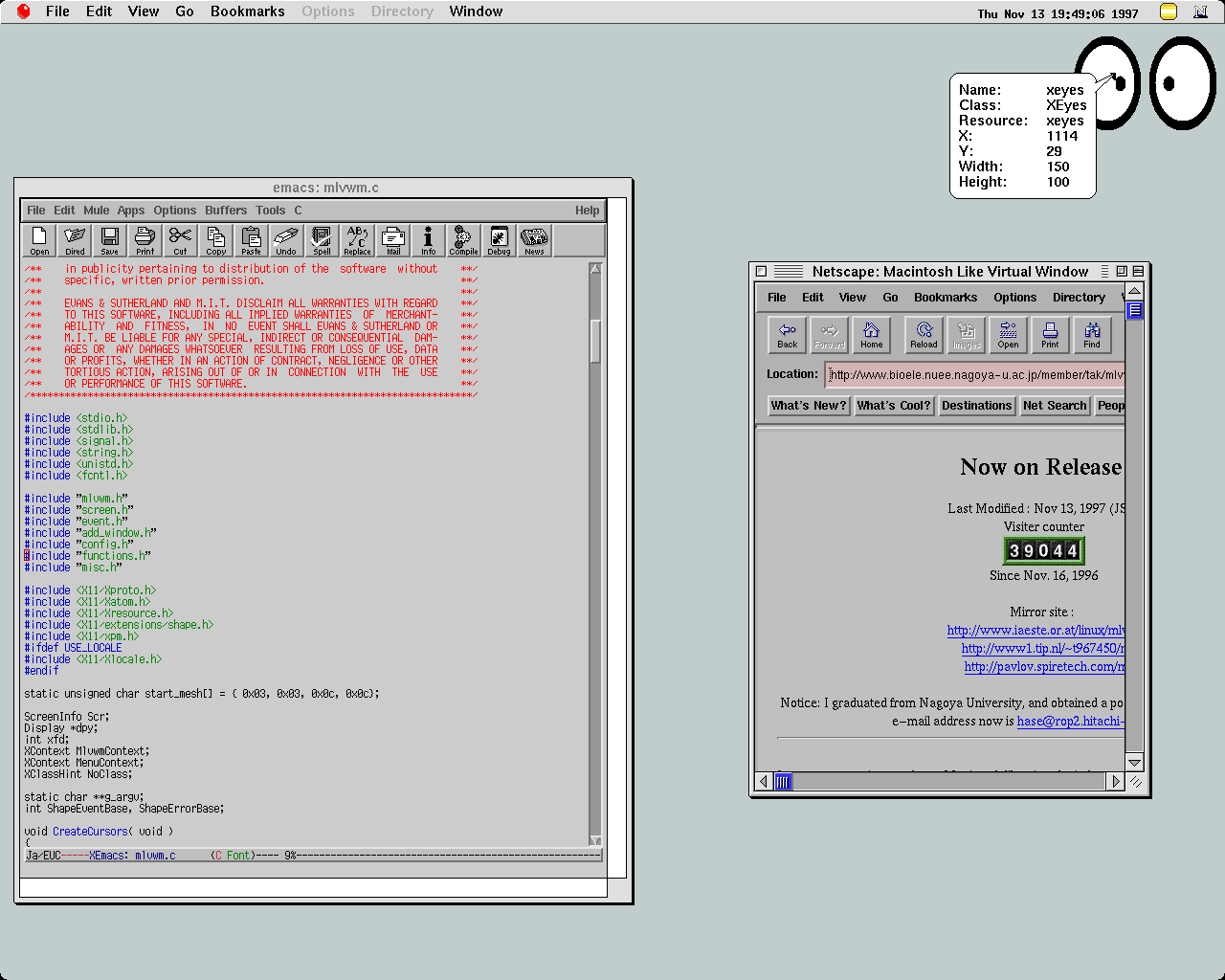
- A screenshot of MLVWM.
- Initial release: 16 November 1996; 29 years ago
- Stable release: 0.9.4 / 9 September 2021; 4 years ago
- Written in: C
- Operating system: Unix-like
- Website: www2u.biglobe.ne.jp/~y-miyata/mlvwm.html
- Repository: github.com/morgant/mlvwm

MLVWM or Macintosh-Like Virtual Window Manager, is an FVWM descendant created by Takashi Hasegawa while studying at Nagoya University and was written entirely in the C programming language. As its name implies, it attempts to emulate the pre-Mac OS X Macintosh look and feel in its layout and window design. Development of MLVWM stalled some time around 2000 but was resumed in 2020 by Morgan Aldridge.

MLVWM spawned a derivative known as HaZe, a Black-and-White (or Monochrome) window manager, although it is no longer under active development.

MLVWM is distributed as freeware with some files licensed as MIT License and Public domain.

== Features ==
MLVWM runs on top of X11 and provides a classic Macintosh-style menubar which can emulate either System 7 or Mac OS 8, though it does not support tray icons. MLVWM also provides window decorations that fit both of the two styles.

== See also ==
- Graphical user interface
