= Terabit Ethernet =

Ethernet with speeds above 100 Gbit/s

Terabit Ethernet (TbE) is Ethernet with speeds above 100 Gigabit Ethernet. The 400 Gigabit Ethernet (400G, 400GbE) and 200 Gigabit Ethernet (200G, 200GbE) standard developed by the IEEE P802.3bs Task Force using broadly similar technology to 100 Gigabit Ethernet was approved on December 6, 2017. On February 16, 2024 the 800 Gigabit Ethernet (800G, 800GbE) standard developed by the IEEE P802.3df Task Force was approved.

The Optical Internetworking Forum (OIF) has already announced five new projects at 112 Gbit/s which would also make 4th generation (single-lane) 100 GbE links possible. The IEEE P802.3df Task Force started work in January 2022 to standardize 800 Gbit/s and 1.6 Tbit/s Ethernet. In November 2022 the IEEE 802.3df project objectives were split in two, with 1.6T and 200G/lane work being moved to the new IEEE 802.3dj project. The timeline for the 802.3dj project indicates completion in July 2026.

== History ==
Facebook and Google, among other companies, have expressed a need for TbE. While a speed of 400 Gbit/s is achievable with existing technology, 1 Tbit/s (1000 Gbit/s) would require different technology. Accordingly, at the IEEE Industry Connections Higher Speed Ethernet Consensus group meeting in September 2012, 400 GbE was chosen as the next generation goal. Additional 200 GbE objectives were added in January 2016.

The University of California, Santa Barbara (UCSB) attracted help from Agilent Technologies, Google, Intel, Rockwell Collins, and Verizon Communications to help with research into next generation Ethernet.

In early 2016, core router platforms from Cisco, Juniper and other major manufacturers supported 400 Gbit/s full duplex data rates per slot. One-, two-, and four-port 100 GbE and one-port 400 GbE line cards were available. In early 2019, 200 GbE line cards became available after 802.3cd standard ratification. In 2020 the Ethernet Technology Consortium announced a specification for 800 Gigabit Ethernet.

200G Ethernet uses PAM4 signaling, which allows 2 bits to be transmitted per clock cycle, but at a higher implementation cost. Cisco introduced an 800G Ethernet switch in 2022. In 2024, Nokia routers with 800G Ethernet were deployed.

== Standards development ==
The IEEE formed the "IEEE 802.3 Industry Connections Ethernet Bandwidth Assessment Ad Hoc", to investigate the business needs for short and long term bandwidth requirements.

IEEE 802.3's "400 Gb/s Ethernet Study Group" started working on the 400 Gbit/s generation standard in March 2013. Results from the study group were published and approved on March 27, 2014. Subsequently, the IEEE 802.3bs Task Force started working to provide physical layer specifications for several link distances.

The foundational IEEE 802.3bs standard defining lanes, signaling and optical media options was approved on December 6, 2017. The IEEE 802.3cd standard with additional lane and optical media options was approved on December 5, 2018. The IEEE 802.3cn standard for longer (40 km) fiber option was approved on December 20, 2019. The IEEE 802.3cm standard for multimode fiber was approved on January 30, 2020. The IEEE 802.3cu standard for additional single-mode fiber options was approved on February 11, 2021. The IEEE 802.3ck standard for copper backplanes and 802.3db standard establishing groundwork for even higher speeds were approved on September 21, 2022.

In November 2022, the IEEE 802.3df project objectives were split in two, with 1.6T and 200G/lane work being moved to the new IEEE 802.3dj project

- Original IEEE P802.3df Objectives
- Updated IEEE P802.3df Objectives to reduce scope to 800G Ethernet using 100G physical lanes
- IEEE P802.3dj Objectives for 1.6 Tbit/s Ethernet and PHYs that employ 200 Gbit/s lanes
- IEEE P802.3dj Objectives updated in May 2023 to include 200G/lane backplane Ethernet
- IEEE P802.3dj Objectives updated in January 2024 to include additional PHY types

The IEEE 802.3df standard was approved on February 16, 2024.

=== IEEE project objectives ===
Like all speeds since 10 Gigabit Ethernet, the standards support only full-duplex operation. Other objectives include:

1. Preserve the Ethernet frame format utilizing the Ethernet MAC
2. Preserve minimum and maximum frame size of current Ethernet standard
3. Support a bit error ratio (BER) of 10^{−13}, which is an improvement over the 10^{−12} BER that was specified for 10GbE, 40GbE, and 100GbE.
4. Support for OTN (transport of Ethernet across optical transport networks), and optional support for Energy-Efficient Ethernet (EEE).

==== 802.3bs project ====
Define physical layer specifications supporting:

- 400 Gbit/s Ethernet
  - at least 100 m over multi-mode fiber (400GBASE-SR16) using 16 parallel strands of fiber each at 25 Gbit/s
  - at least 500 m over single-mode fiber (400GBASE-DR4) using 4 parallel strands of fiber each at 100 Gbit/s
  - at least 2 km over single-mode fiber (400GBASE-FR8) using 8 parallel wavelengths (CWDM) each at 50 Gbit/s
  - at least 10 km over single-mode fiber (400GBASE-LR8) using 8 parallel wavelengths (CWDM) each at 50 Gbit/s
  - 8 and 16 lane chip-to-chip/chip-to-module electrical interfaces (400GAUI-8 and 400GAUI-16)
- 200 Gbit/s Ethernet
  - at least 500 m over single-mode fiber (200GBASE-DR4) using 4 parallel strands of fiber each at 50 Gbit/s
  - at least 2 km over single-mode fiber (200GBASE-FR4) using 4 parallel wavelengths (CWDM) each at 50 Gbit/s
  - at least 10 km over single-mode fiber (200GBASE-LR4) using 4 parallel wavelengths (CWDM) each at 50 Gbit/s
  - 4 or 8 lane chip-to-chip/chip-to-module electrical interfaces (200GAUI-4 and 200GAUI-8)

==== 802.3cd project ====
- Define four-lane 200 Gbit/s PHYs for operation over:
  - copper twin-axial cables with lengths up to at least 3 m (200GBASE-CR4).
  - printed circuit board backplane with a total channel insertion loss of ≤ 30 dB at 13.28125 GHz (200GBASE-KR4).
- Define 200 Gbit/s PHYs for operation over MMF with lengths up to at least 100 m (200GBASE-SR4).

==== 802.3ck project ====
- 200 Gbit/s Ethernet
  - Define a two-lane 200 Gbit/s Attachment Unit interface (AUI) for chip-to-module applications, compatible with PMDs based on 100 Gbit/s per lane optical signaling (200GAUI-2 C2M)
  - Define a two-lane 200 Gbit/s Attachment Unit Interface (AUI) for chip-to-chip applications (200GAUI-2 C2C)
  - Define a two-lane 200 Gbit/s PHY for operation over electrical backplanes an insertion loss ≤ 28 dB at 26.56 GHz (200GBASE-KR2)
  - Define a two-lane 200 Gbit/s PHY for operation over twin axial copper cables with lengths up to at least 2 m (200GBASE-CR2)
- 400 Gbit/s Ethernet
  - Define a four-lane 400 Gbit/s Attachment Unit interface (AUI) for chip-to-module applications, compatible with PMDs based on 100 Gbit/s per lane optical signaling (400GAUI-4 C2M)
  - Define a four-lane 400 Gbit/s Attachment Unit Interface (AUI) for chip-to-chip applications (400GAUI-4 C2C)
  - Define a four-lane 400 Gbit/s PHY for operation over electrical backplanes an insertion loss ≤ 28 dB at 26.56 GHz (400GBASE-KR4)
  - Define a four-lane 400 Gbit/s PHY for operation over twin axial copper cables with lengths up to at least 2 m (400GBASE-CR4)

==== 802.3cm project ====
- 400 Gbit/s Ethernet
  - Define a physical layer specification supporting 400 Gbit/s operation over 8 pairs of MMF with lengths up to at least 100 m (400GBASE-SR8)
  - Define a physical layer specification supporting 400 Gbit/s operation over 4 pairs of MMF with lengths up to at least 100 m (400GBASE-SR4.2)

==== 802.3cn project ====
- 200 Gbit/s Ethernet
  - Provide a physical layer specification supporting 200 Gbit/s operation over four wavelengths capable of at least 40 km of SMF (200GBASE-ER4)
- 400 Gbit/s Ethernet
  - Provide a physical layer specification supporting 400 Gbit/s operation over eight wavelengths capable of at least 40 km of SMF (400GBASE-ER8)

==== 802.3cu project ====
- Define a four-wavelength 400 Gbit/s PHY for operation over SMF with lengths up to at least 2 km (400GBASE-FR4)
- Define a four-wavelength 400 Gbit/s PHY for operation over SMF with lengths up to at least 6 km (400GBASE-LR4-6)

==== 802.3cw project ====
- Provide a physical layer specification supporting 400 Gbit/s operation on a single wavelength capable of at least 80 km over a DWDM system (400GBASE-ZR) Dual polarization 16-state quadrature amplitude modulation (DP-16QAM) with coherent detection is proposed. The project was canceled in 2024.

==== 802.3db project ====
- 200 Gbit/s Ethernet
  - Define a physical layer specification that supports 200 Gbit/s operation over 2 pairs of MMF with lengths up to at least 50 m (200GBASE-VR2)
  - Define a physical layer specification that supports 200 Gbit/s operation over 2 pairs of MMF with lengths up to at least 100 m (200GBASE-SR2)
- 400 Gbit/s Ethernet
  - Define a physical layer specification that supports 400 Gbit/s operation over 4 pairs of MMF with lengths up to at least 50 m (400GBASE-VR4)
  - Define a physical layer specification that supports 400 Gbit/s operation over 4 pairs of MMF with lengths up to at least 100 m (400GBASE-SR4)

'IEEE P802.3db 100 Gb/s, 200 Gb/s, and 400 Gb/s Short Reach Fiber Task Force'

==== 802.3df project ====
- Adds 800G Ethernet rate and specifies port types using existing 100G per lane technology

IEEE P802.3df Objectives for 800 Gbit/s Ethernet and 400G and 800G PHYs using 100 Gbit/s lanes

==== 802.3dj project ====
- Adds 1.6 Tbit/s Ethernet rate and specifies port types using new 200 Gbit/s per lane technology.

IEEE P802.3dj Objectives for 1.6 Tbit/s Ethernet and 200, 400 800 Gbit/s, and 1.6 Tbit/s PHYs using 200 Gbit/s lanes

==== 802.3ds project ====
- Adds 200, 400, 800 Gbit/s and 1.6 Tbit/s MMF PHYs with 30m and 50m reach.

IEEE P802.3ds Objectives for 200 Gb/s per Wavelength MMF PHYs

=== 200G port types ===
Legend for fibre-based PHYs
Fibre type	Introduced	Performance
MMF FDDI 62.5/125 µm	1987	160 MHz·km @ 850 nm
MMF OM1 62.5/125 µm	1989	200 MHz·km @ 850 nm
MMF OM2 50/125 µm	1998	500 MHz·km @ 850 nm
MMF OM3 50/125 µm	2003	1500 MHz·km @ 850 nm
MMF OM4 50/125 µm	2008	3500 MHz·km @ 850 nm
MMF OM5 50/125 µm	2016	3500 MHz·km @ 850 nm and 1850 MHz·km @ 950 nm
SMF OS1 9/125 µm	1998	1.0 dB/km @ 1300/1550 nm
SMF OS2 9/125 µm	2000	0.4 dB/km @ 1300/1550 nm

Name	Standard	Status	Media	Connector	Transceiver Module	Reach in m	# Media (⇆)	# Lambdas (→)	# Lanes (→)	Notes
200 Gigabit Ethernet (200 GbE) (1st Generation: 25GbE-based) (Data rate: 200 Gbit/s - Line code: 256b/257b × RS-FEC(544,514) × NRZ - Line rate: 8x 26.5625 GBd = 212.5 GBd - Full-Duplex)
200GAUI-8	802.3bs-2017 (CL120B/C)	current	Chip-to-chip/ Chip-to-module interface	—N/a	—N/a	0.25	16	N/A	8	PCBs
200 Gigabit Ethernet (200 GbE) (2nd Generation: 50GbE-based) (Data rate: 200 Gbit/s - Line code: 256b/257b × RS-FEC(544,514) × PAM4 - Line rate: 4x 26.5625 GBd x2 = 212.5 GBd - Full-Duplex)
200GAUI-4	802.3bs-2017 (CL120D/E)	current	Chip-to-chip/ Chip-to-module interface	—N/a	—N/a	0.25	8	N/A	4	PCBs
200GBASE-KR4	802.3cd-2018 (CL137)	current	Cu-Backplane	—N/a	—N/a	1	8	N/A	4	PCBs; total insertion loss of ≤ 30 dB at 13.28125 GHz
200GBASE-CR4	802.3cd-2018 (CL136)	current	twinaxial copper cable	QSFP-DD, QSFP56, microQSFP, OSFP	N/A	3	8	N/A	4	Data centres (in-rack)
200GBASE-SR4	802.3cd-2018 (CL138)	current	Fibre; 850 nm	MPO/MTP (MPO-12)	QSFP56	OM3: 70	8	1	4	uses four fibers in each direction
200GBASE-SR4	802.3cd-2018 (CL138)	current	Fibre; 850 nm	MPO/MTP (MPO-12)	QSFP56	OM4: 100	8	1	4	uses four fibers in each direction
200GBASE-DR4	802.3bs-2017 (CL121)	current	Fibre; 1310 nm	MPO/MTP (MPO-12)	QSFP56	OS2: 500	8	1	4	uses four fibers in each direction
200GBASE-FR4	802.3bs-2017 (CL122)	current	Fibre; 1271 – 1331 nm	LC	QSFP56	OS2: 2k	2	4	4	WDM
200GBASE-LR4	802.3bs-2017 (CL122)	current	Fibre; 1295.56 – 1309.14 nm	LC	QSFP56	OS2: 10k	2	4	4	WDM
200GBASE-ER4	802.3cn-2019 (CL122)	current	Fibre; 1295.56 – 1309.14 nm	LC	QSFP56	OS2: 40k	2	4	4	WDM
200 Gigabit Ethernet (200 GbE) (3rd Generation: 100GbE-based) (Data rate: 200 Gbit/s - Line code: 256b/257b × RS-FEC(544,514) × PAM4 - Line rate: 2x 53.1250 GBd x2 = 212.5 GBd - Full-Duplex)
200GAUI-2	802.3ck-2022 (CL120F/G)	current	Chip-to-chip/ Chip-to-module interface	—N/a	N/A	0.25	4	N/A	2	PCBs
200GBASE-KR2	802.3ck-2022 (CL163)	current	Cu backplane	—N/a	—N/a	1	4	N/A	2	PCBs; total insertion loss of ≤ 28 dB at 26.56 GHz
200GBASE-CR2	802.3ck-2022 (CL162)	current	twinaxial copper cable	QSFP-DD, QSFP112, SFP-DD112, DSFP, OSFP	N/A	2	4	N/A	2	
200GBASE-VR2	802.3db-2022 (CL167)	current	Fiber; 850 nm	MPO (MPO-12)	QSFP; QSFP-DD; SFP-DD112	OM3: 30	4	1	2	
200GBASE-VR2	802.3db-2022 (CL167)	current	Fiber; 850 nm	MPO (MPO-12)	QSFP; QSFP-DD; SFP-DD112	OM4: 50	4	1	2	
200GBASE-SR2	802.3db-2022 (CL167)	current	Fiber; 850 nm	MPO (MPO-12)	QSFP; QSFP-DD; SFP-DD112	OM3: 60	4	1	2	
200GBASE-SR2	802.3db-2022 (CL167)	current	Fiber; 850 nm	MPO (MPO-12)	QSFP; QSFP-DD; SFP-DD112	OM4: 100	4	1	2	
200 Gigabit Ethernet (200 GbE) (4th Generation: 200GbE-based) (Data rate: 200 Gbit/s - Line code: 256b/257b × RS-FEC(544,514) × PAM4 - Line rate: 1x 106.25 GBd x2 = 212.5 GBd - Full-Duplex)
200GAUI-1	802.3dj (CL176D/E)	development	Chip-to-chip/ Chip-to-module interface	—N/a	N/A	0.25	2	N/A	1	PCBs
200GBASE-KR1	802.3dj (CL178)	development	Cu backplane	—N/a	—N/a	N/A	2	N/A	1	PCBs; total insertion loss of ≤ 40 dB at 53.125 GHz
200GBASE-CR1	802.3dj (CL179)	development	twinaxial copper cable	TBD	N/A	1	2	N/A	1	
200GBASE-DR1	802.3dj (CL180)	development	Fiber; 1310 nm	TBD	TBD	OS2: 500	2	1	1	
200 Gigabit Ethernet (200 GbE) (200GbE-based) (Data rate: 200 Gbit/s - Line code: 256b/257b × Concatenated outer RS-FEC(544,514) × Concatenated inner Hamming FEC (128, 120) x PAM4 - Line rate: 1x 113.4375 GBd x2 = 226.875 GBd - Full-Duplex)
200GBASE-DR1-2	802.3dj (CL182)	development	Fiber; 1310 nm	TBD	TBD	OS2: 2k	2	1	1	

=== 400G port types ===
Legend for fibre-based PHYs
Fibre type	Introduced	Performance
MMF FDDI 62.5/125 µm	1987	160 MHz·km @ 850 nm
MMF OM1 62.5/125 µm	1989	200 MHz·km @ 850 nm
MMF OM2 50/125 µm	1998	500 MHz·km @ 850 nm
MMF OM3 50/125 µm	2003	1500 MHz·km @ 850 nm
MMF OM4 50/125 µm	2008	3500 MHz·km @ 850 nm
MMF OM5 50/125 µm	2016	3500 MHz·km @ 850 nm and 1850 MHz·km @ 950 nm
SMF OS1 9/125 µm	1998	1.0 dB/km @ 1300/1550 nm
SMF OS2 9/125 µm	2000	0.4 dB/km @ 1300/1550 nm

Name	Standard	Status	Media	Connector	Transceiver Module	Reach in m	# Media (⇆)	# λ (→)	# Lanes (→)	Notes
400 Gigabit Ethernet (400 GbE) (1st Generation: 25GbE-based) (Data rate: 400 Gbit/s - Line code: 256b/257b × RS-FEC(544,514) × NRZ - Line rate: 16x 26.5625 GBd = 425 GBd - Full-Duplex)
400GAUI-16	802.3bs-2017 (CL120B/C)	current	Chip-to-chip/ Chip-to-module interface	—N/a	—N/a	0.25	32	N/A	16	PCBs
400GBASE-SR16	802.3bs-2017 (CL123)	current	Fibre; 850 nm	MPO/MTP (MPO-32)	CFP8	OM3: 70	32	1	16	
400GBASE-SR16	802.3bs-2017 (CL123)	current	Fibre; 850 nm	MPO/MTP (MPO-32)	CFP8	OM4: 100	32	1	16	
400GBASE-SR16	802.3bs-2017 (CL123)	current	Fibre; 850 nm	MPO/MTP (MPO-32)	CFP8	OM5: 100	32	1	16	
400 Gigabit Ethernet (400 GbE) (2nd Generation: 50GbE-based) (Data rate: 400 Gbit/s - Line code: 256b/257b × RS-FEC(544,514) × PAM4 - Line rate: 8x 26.5625 GBd x2 = 425.0 GBd - Full-Duplex)
400GAUI-8	802.3bs-2017 (CL 120D/E)	current	Chip-to-chip/ Chip-to-module interface	—N/a	—N/a	0.25	16	N/A	8	PCBs
400GBASE-KR8	proprietary (ETC) (CL120)	current	Cu-Backplane	—N/a	—N/a	1	8	N/A	8	PCBs
400GBASE-SR8	802.3cm-2020 (CL138)	current	Fiber; 850 nm	MPO/MTP (MPO-16)	QSFP-DD; OSFP	OM3: 70	16	1	8	
400GBASE-SR8	802.3cm-2020 (CL138)	current	Fiber; 850 nm	MPO/MTP (MPO-16)	QSFP-DD; OSFP	OM4: 100	16	1	8	
400GBASE-SR8	802.3cm-2020 (CL138)	current	Fiber; 850 nm	MPO/MTP (MPO-16)	QSFP-DD; OSFP	OM5: 100	16	1	8	
400GBASE-SR4.2 (Bidirectional)	802.3cm-2020 (CL150)	current	Fiber; 850 nm 912 nm	MPO/MTP (MPO-12)	QSFP-DD	OM3: 70	8	2	8	Bidirectional WDM
400GBASE-SR4.2 (Bidirectional)	802.3cm-2020 (CL150)	current	Fiber; 850 nm 912 nm	MPO/MTP (MPO-12)	QSFP-DD	OM4: 100	8	2	8	Bidirectional WDM
400GBASE-SR4.2 (Bidirectional)	802.3cm-2020 (CL150)	current	Fiber; 850 nm 912 nm	MPO/MTP (MPO-12)	QSFP-DD	OM5: 150	8	2	8	Bidirectional WDM
400GBASE-SRBD (Bidirectional)	proprietary (Cisco)	current	Fiber; 850 nm 880 nm 910 nm 940 nm	LC	QSFP-DD	OM3: 50	2	4 (Note: A 400GBASE-SRBD transceiver transmits four wavelengths per fiber core, two on one strand of the duplex pair and two on the other. This is done on different wavelengths to avoid interference, since both sides illuminate both fibres of the pair, and allows the same type of transceiver to be used on both ends of the connection.) (WDM, bidi)	8	Bidirectional WDM
400GBASE-SRBD (Bidirectional)	proprietary (Cisco)	current	Fiber; 850 nm 880 nm 910 nm 940 nm	LC	QSFP-DD	OM4: 70	2	4 (WDM, bidi)	8	Bidirectional WDM
400GBASE-SRBD (Bidirectional)	proprietary (Cisco)	current	Fiber; 850 nm 880 nm 910 nm 940 nm	LC	QSFP-DD	OM5: 100	2	4 (WDM, bidi)	8	Bidirectional WDM
400GBASE-FR8	802.3bs-2017 (CL122)	current	Fibre; 1273.54 – 1309.14 nm	LC	QSFP-DD; OSFP	OS2: 2k	2	8	8	WDM
400GBASE-LR8	802.3bs-2017 (CL122)	current	Fibre; 1273.54 – 1309.14 nm	LC	QSFP-DD; OSFP	OS2: 10k	2	8	8	WDM
400GBASE-ER8	802.3cn-2019 (CL122)	current	Fibre; 1273.54 – 1309.14 nm	LC	QSFP-DD	OS2: 40k	2	8	8	WDM
400 Gigabit Ethernet (400 GbE) (3rd Generation: 100GbE-based) (Data rate: 400 Gbit/s - Line code: 256b/257b × RS-FEC(544,514) × PAM4 - Line rate: 4x 53.1250 GBd x2 = 425.0 GBd - Full-Duplex)
400GAUI-4	802.3ck-2022 (CL120F/G)	current	Chip-to-chip/ Chip-to-module interface	—N/a	—N/a	0.25	8	N/A	4	PCBs
400GBASE-KR4	802.3ck-2022 (CL163)	current	Cu-Backplane	—N/a	—N/a	1	8	N/A	4	PCBs; total insertion loss of ≤ 28 dB at 26.56 GHz
400GBASE-CR4	802.3ck-2022 (CL162)	current	twinaxial copper cable	QSFP-DD, QSFP112, OSFP	N/A	2	8	N/A	4	Data centres (in-rack)
400GBASE-VR4	802.3db-2022 (CL167)	current	Fibre; 850 nm	MPO (MPO-12)	QSFP-DD	OM3: 30	8	1	4	
400GBASE-VR4	802.3db-2022 (CL167)	current	Fibre; 850 nm	MPO (MPO-12)	QSFP-DD	OM4: 50	8	1	4	
400GBASE-VR4	802.3db-2022 (CL167)	current	Fibre; 850 nm	MPO (MPO-12)	QSFP-DD	OM5: 50	8	1	4	
400GBASE-SR4	802.3db-2022 (CL167)	current	Fibre; 850 nm	MPO (MPO-12)	QSFP-DD	OM3: 60	8	1	4	
400GBASE-SR4	802.3db-2022 (CL167)	current	Fibre; 850 nm	MPO (MPO-12)	QSFP-DD	OM4: 100	8	1	4	
400GBASE-SR4	802.3db-2022 (CL167)	current	Fibre; 850 nm	MPO (MPO-12)	QSFP-DD	OM5: 100	8	1	4	
400GBASE-DR4	802.3bs-2017 (CL124)	current	Fibre; 1310 nm	MPO/MTP (MPO-12)	QSFP-DD; OSFP	OS2: 500	8	1	4	
400GBASE-DR4-2	802.3df-2024 (CL124)	current	Fibre; 1310 nm	MPO/MTP (MPO-12)	QSFP-DD; OSFP	OS2: 2k	8	1	4	
400GBASE-XDR4; 400GBASE-DR4+	proprietary (non IEEE)	current	Fibre; 1310 nm	MPO/MTP (MPO-12)	QSFP-DD; OSFP	OSx: 2k	8	1	4	
400GBASE-FR4	802.3cu-2021 (CL151)	current	Fibre; 1271−1331 nm	LC	QSFP-DD; OSFP	OS2: 2k	2	4	4	Multi-Vendor Standard
400GBASE-LR4-6	802.3cu-2021 (CL151)	current	Fibre; 1271−1331 nm	LC	QSFP-DD	OS2: 6k	2	4	4	
400GBASE-LR4-10	proprietary (MSA, Sept 2020)	current	Fibre; 1271−1331 nm	LC	QSFP-DD	OSx: 10k	2	4	4	Multi-Vendor Standard
400GBASE-ZR	802.3cw (CL155/156)	canceled	Fibre	LC	QSFP-DD; OSFP	OSx: 80k	2	1	2	59.84375 Gigabaud (DP-16QAM)
400 Gigabit Ethernet (400 GbE) (4th Generation: 200GbE-based) (Data rate: 400 Gbit/s - Line code: 256b/257b × RS-FEC(544,514) × PAM4 - Line rate: 2x 106.25 GBd x2 = 425 GBd - Full-Duplex)
400GAUI-2	802.3dj (CL176D/E)	development	Chip-to-chip/ Chip-to-module interface	—N/a	N/A	0.25	2	N/A	1	PCBs
400GBASE-KR2	802.3dj (CL178)	development	Cu backplane	—N/a	—N/a	N/A	4	N/A	2	PCBs; total insertion loss of ≤ 40 dB at 53.125 GHz
400GBASE-CR2	802.3dj (CL179)	development	twinaxial copper cable	TBD	N/A	1	4	N/A	2	
400GBASE-DR2	802.3dj (CL180)	development	Fiber; 1310 nm	TBD	TBD	OS2: 500	4	1	2	
400 Gigabit Ethernet (400 GbE) (200GbE-based) (Data rate: 400 Gbit/s - Line code: 256b/257b × Concatenated outer RS-FEC(544,514) × Concatenated inner Hamming FEC (128, 120) x PAM4 - Line rate: 2x 113.4375 GBd x2 = 453.75 GBd - Full-Duplex)
400GBASE-DR2-2	802.3dj (CL182)	development	Fiber; 1310 nm	TBD	TBD	OS2: 2k	4	1	2	

=== 800G port types ===
Legend for fibre-based PHYs
Fibre type	Introduced	Performance
MMF FDDI 62.5/125 µm	1987	160 MHz·km @ 850 nm
MMF OM1 62.5/125 µm	1989	200 MHz·km @ 850 nm
MMF OM2 50/125 µm	1998	500 MHz·km @ 850 nm
MMF OM3 50/125 µm	2003	1500 MHz·km @ 850 nm
MMF OM4 50/125 µm	2008	3500 MHz·km @ 850 nm
MMF OM5 50/125 µm	2016	3500 MHz·km @ 850 nm and 1850 MHz·km @ 950 nm
SMF OS1 9/125 µm	1998	1.0 dB/km @ 1300/1550 nm
SMF OS2 9/125 µm	2000	0.4 dB/km @ 1300/1550 nm

Name	Standard	Status	Media	Connector	Transceiver Module	Reach in m	# Media (⇆)	# λ (→)	# Lanes (→)	Notes
800 Gigabit Ethernet (800 GbE) (1st Generation: 100GbE-based) (Data rate: 800 Gbit/s - Line code: 256b/257b × RS-FEC(544,514) × PAM4 - Line rate: 8x 53.1250 GBd x2 = 850 GBd - Full-Duplex)
800GAUI-8	802.3df-2024 (CL120F/G)	current	Chip-to-chip/ Chip-to-module interface	—N/a	—N/a	0.25	16	N/A	8	PCBs
800GBASE-KR8	802.3df-2024 (CL163)	current	Cu-Backplane	—N/a	—N/a	1	16	N/A	8	PCBs; total insertion loss of ≤ 28 dB at 26.56 GHz
800GBASE-CR8	802.3df-2024 (CL162)	current	twinaxial copper cable	QSFP−DD800; OSFP	N/A	2	16	N/A	8	Data centres (in-rack)
800GBASE-VR8	802.3df-2024 (CL167)	current	Fibre; 850 nm	MPO (MPO-16)	QSFP-DD; OSFP	OM3: 30	16	1	8	
800GBASE-VR8	802.3df-2024 (CL167)	current	Fibre; 850 nm	MPO (MPO-16)	QSFP-DD; OSFP	OM4: 50	16	1	8	
800GBASE-VR8	802.3df-2024 (CL167)	current	Fibre; 850 nm	MPO (MPO-16)	QSFP-DD; OSFP	OM5: 50	16	1	8	
800GBASE-SR8	802.3df-2024 (CL167)	current	Fibre; 850 nm	MPO (MPO-16)	QSFP-DD; OSFP	OM3: 60	16	1	8	
800GBASE-SR8	802.3df-2024 (CL167)	current	Fibre; 850 nm	MPO (MPO-16)	QSFP-DD; OSFP	OM4: 100	16	1	8	
800GBASE-SR8	802.3df-2024 (CL167)	current	Fibre; 850 nm	MPO (MPO-16)	QSFP-DD; OSFP	OM5: 100	16	1	8	
800GBASE-DR8	802.3df-2024 (CL124)	current	Fibre; 1310 nm	MPO/MTP (MPO-16)	QSFP-DD; OSFP	OS2: 500	16	1	8	
800GBASE-DR8-2	802.3df-2024 (CL124)	current	Fibre; 1310 nm	MPO/MTP (MPO-16)	QSFP-DD; OSFP	OS2: 2k	16	1	8	
800 Gigabit Ethernet (800 GbE) (2nd Generation: 200GbE-based) (Data rate: 800 Gbit/s - Line code: 256b/257b × RS-FEC(544,514) × PAM4 - Line rate: 4x 106.25 GBd x2 = 850 GBd - Full-Duplex)
800GAUI-4	802.3dj (CL176D/E)	development	Chip-to-chip/ Chip-to-module interface	—N/a	N/A	0.25	8	N/A	4	PCBs
800GBASE-KR4	802.3dj (CL178)	development	Cu backplane	—N/a	—N/a	N/A	8	N/A	4	PCBs; total insertion loss of ≤ 40 dB at 53.125 GHz
800GBASE-CR4	802.3dj (CL179)	development	twinaxial copper cable	QSFP224; QSFP-DD1600; OSFP1600	N/A	1	8	N/A	4	
800GBASE-DR4	802.3dj (CL180)	development	Fiber; 1310 nm	MPO/MTP (MPO-12)	OSFP	OS2: 500	8	1	4	
800GBASE-FR4-500	802.3dj (CL181)	development	Fiber; 1271 - 1331 nm	LC	TBD	OS2: 500	2	4	4	
800 Gigabit Ethernet (800 GbE) (200GbE-based) (Data rate: 800 Gbit/s - Line code: 256b/257b × Concatenated outer RS-FEC(544,514) × Concatenated inner Hamming FEC (128, 120) x PAM4 - Line rate: 4x 113.4375 GBd x2 = 907.5 GBd - Full-Duplex)
800GBASE-DR4-2	802.3dj (CL182)	development	Fiber; 1310 nm	MPO/MTP (MPO-12)	TBD	OS2: 2k	8	1	4	
800GBASE-FR4	802.3dj (CL183)	development	Fiber; 1271 - 1331 nm	LC	TBD	OS2: 2k	2	4	4	
800GBASE-LR4	802.3dj (CL183)	development	Fiber; 1271 - 1331 nm	LC	TBD	OS2: 10k	2	4	4	
800 Gigabit Ethernet (800 GbE) (200GbE-based) (Data rate: 800 Gbit/s - Line code: 256b/257b × Concatenated outer RS-FEC(544,514) × clause 184 inner BCH(126,110) FEC x dual polarization 16-state quadrature amplitude modulation (DP-16QAM) - Line rate: 123.6364 GBd - Full-Duplex)
800GBASE-LR1	802.3dj (CL185)	development	Fiber; 1310 nm	LC	TBD	OS2: 10k	2	1	1	DP-16QAM with coherent detection
800 Gigabit Ethernet (800 GbE) (200GbE-based) (Data rate: 800 Gbit/s - Line code: 256b/257b × Concatenated outer RS-FEC(544,514) × clause 186 inner BCH(256,239) FEC x DP-16QAM modulation - Line rate: 118.203351 GBd - Full-Duplex)
800GBASE-ER1-20	802.3dj (CL187)	development	Fiber; 1550 nm	LC	TBD	OS2: 20k	2	1	1	DP-16QAM with coherent detection
800GBASE-ER1	802.3dj (CL187)	development	Fiber; 1550 nm	LC	TBD	OS2: 40k	2	1	1	DP-16QAM with coherent detection

=== 1.6T port types ===
Name	Standard	Status	Media	Connector	Transceiver Module	Reach in m	# Media (⇆)	# λ (→)	# Lanes (→)	Notes
1.6 Terabit Ethernet (1.6 TbE) (200GbE-based) (Data rate: 1.6 Tbit/s - Line code: 256b/257b × RS-FEC(544,514) × PAM4 - Line rate: 8x 106.25 GBd x2 = 1700 GBd - Full-Duplex)
1.6TAUI-8	802.3dj (CL176D/E)	development	Chip-to-chip/ Chip-to-module interface	—N/a	N/A	0.25	16	N/A	8	PCBs
1.6TBASE-KR8	802.3dj (CL178)	development	Cu backplane	—N/a	—N/a	N/A	16	N/A	8	PCBs; total insertion loss of ≤ 40 dB at 53.125 GHz
1.6TBASE-CR8	802.3dj (CL179)	development	twinaxial copper cable	TBD	N/A	1	16	N/A	8	
1.6TBASE-DR8	802.3dj (CL180)	development	Fiber; 1310 nm	TBD	TBD	OS2: 500	16	1	8	
1.6 Terabit Ethernet (1.6 TbE) (200GbE-based) (Data rate: 1.6 Tbit/s - Line code: 256b/257b × Concatenated outer RS-FEC(544,514) × Concatenated inner Hamming FEC (128, 120) x PAM4 - Line rate: 8x 113.4375 GBd x2 = 1815 GBd - Full-Duplex)
1.6TBASE-DR8-2	802.3dj (CL182)	development	Fiber; 1310 nm	TBD	TBD	OS2: 2k	16	1	8	

== See also ==
- Ethernet Alliance
- Interconnect bottleneck
- Fiber-optic cable
- Optical communication
- Parallel optical interface
