= 10 Gigabit Ethernet Alliance =

- Abbreviation: 10GEA
- Successor: Ethernet Alliance
- Formation: February 2000
- Dissolved: July 2003
- Type: Industry trade group

The 10 Gigabit Ethernet Alliance (10GEA) was an independent (not directly related to Institute of Electrical and Electronics Engineers (IEEE), although working in collaboration with it) organization which aimed to further 10 Gigabit Ethernet development and market acceptance. Founded in February 2000 by a consortium of companies, the organization provided IEEE with technology demonstrations (including, for instance, a May 7, 2002 demonstration in Las Vegas, in which a 200 plus kilometres 10 Gb Ethernet network was deployed, using 10GBASE-LR, 10GBASE-ER, 10GBASE-SR and 10GBASE-LW ports, as well as presenting communication over the IEEE 802.3ae XAUI interface) and specifications. Its efforts bore fruit with the IEEE Standards Association (IEEE-SA) Standards Board's approval in June 2002 of the IEEE 802.3 standard (formulated by the IEEE P802.3ae 10 Gbit/s Ethernet Task Force).

The 10GEA was founded by 3Com, Cisco Systems, Extreme Networks, Intel Corporation, Nortel Networks, Sun Microsystems, and World Wide Packets. Other companies at various times supporting the consortium included: Agilent Technologies Inc., Blaze Network Products, Cable Design Technologies, Corning Inc., Enterasys Networks, Force10 Networks Inc., Foundry Networks Inc., Hitachi Cable Ltd, Infineon Technologies, Ixia, JDS Uniphase, Marvell Technology Group Ltd., Mindspeed, Molex Inc., OFS (part of Lucent), ONI Systems/CIENA, Optillion, PMC-Sierra, Primarion, Quake Technologies (acquired by Applied Micro Circuits Corporation), Spirent Communications, and Velio Communications (later acquired by LSI Corporation).

== See also ==
- Ethernet Alliance
