= Data signaling rate =

Rate in telecommunications

In telecommunications, data signaling rate (DSR), also known as gross bit rate, is the aggregate rate at which data passes a point in the transmission path of a data transmission system.

== Properties ==
1. The DSR is usually expressed in bits per second.
2. The data signaling rate is given by $\sum_{i = 1}^{m} \frac{\log_2 {n_i} }{T_i}$ where m is the number of parallel channels, n_{i} is the number of significant conditions of the modulation in the i-th channel, and T_{i} is the unit interval, expressed in seconds, for the i-th channel.
3. For serial transmission in a single channel, the DSR reduces to (1/T)log_{2}n; with a two-condition modulation, i. e. n = 2, the DSR is 1/T, according to Hartley's law.
4. For parallel transmission with equal unit intervals and equal numbers of significant conditions on each channel, the DSR is (m/T)log_{2}n; in the case of a two-condition modulation, this reduces to m/T.
5. The DSR may be expressed in bauds, in which case, the factor log_{2}n_{i} in the above summation formula should be deleted when calculating bauds.
6. In synchronous binary signaling, the DSR in bits per second may be numerically the same as the modulation rate expressed in bauds. Signal processors, such as four-phase modems, cannot change the DSR, but the modulation rate depends on the line modulation scheme, in accordance with Note 4. For example, in a 2400 bit/s 4-phase sending modem, the signaling rate is 2400 bit/s on the serial input side, but the modulation rate is only 1200 bauds on the 4-phase output side.

== Maximum rate ==
The maximum user signaling rate, synonymous to gross bit rate or data signaling rate, is the maximum rate, in bits per second, at which binary information can be transferred in a given direction between users over the communications system facilities dedicated to a particular information transfer transaction, under conditions of continuous transmission and no overhead information.

For a single channel, the signaling rate is given by $SCSR = \frac{\log_2{n} }{T}$, where SCSR is the single-channel signaling rate in bits per second, T is the minimum time interval in seconds for which each level must be maintained, and n is the number of significant conditions of modulation of the channel.

In the case where an individual end-to-end telecommunications service is provided by parallel channels, the parallel-channel signaling rate is given by $PCSR = \sum_{i = 1}^{m} \frac{\log_2 {n_i} }{T_i}$, where PCSR is the total signaling rate for m channels, m is the number of parallel channels, T_{i} is the minimum interval between significant instants for the I-th channel, and n_{i} is the number of significant conditions of modulation for the I-th channel.

In the case where an end-to-end telecommunications service is provided by tandem channels, the end-to-end signaling rate is the lowest signaling rate among the component channels.

== Rates and standards ==
Data rate	Standard
1.5 Mbit/s	USB 1.0
1.544 Mbit/s	Digital Signal 1
12 Mbit/s	USB 1.1
155 Mbit/s	OC-3
480 Mbit/s	USB 2.0
622 Mbit/s	OC-12
1000 Mbit/s	Gigabit Ethernet
1063 Mbit/s	Fibre Channel (1GFC)
2125 Mbit/s	2GFC
2488 Mbit/s	OC-48
2500 Mbit/s	2.5GBASE-T, InfiniBand
2666 Mbit/s	OC-48(FEC)
3125 Mbit/s	×4 10GBASE-LX4
4250 Mbit/s	4GFC
5000 Mbit/s	5GBASE-T, USB 5Gbps
8500 Mbit/s	8GFC
9.953 Gbit/s	OC-192
10.000 Gbit/s	USB 10Gbps
10.3125 Gbit/s	10 GbE, ×4 40GbE, ×10 100GBASE-CR10
10.51875 Gbit/s	10GFC
10.664 Gbit/s	OC-192 (FEC)
10.709 Gbit/s	OC-192 (ITU-T G.709)
11.100 Gbit/s	10 GbE FEC
14.025 Gbit/s	16GFC "Gen 5"
25.78125 Gbit/s	×4 100GBASE-CR4
28.05 Gbit/s	32GFC "Gen 6"
28.05 Gbit/s	×4 128GFC "Gen 6"
120.579 Gbit/s	100GBASE-ZR

== See also ==
- Bit rate
- Bandwidth (computing)
- Baud
- Symbol rate
