= Hitachi Cable =

Japanese manufacturing company

Hitachi Cable Limited 日立電線株式会社
- Type: Public kabushiki gaisha
- Industry: Manufacturing (non-ferros metal)
- Predecessor: Hitachi, Ltd.
- Founded: Tokyo, Japan (April 10, 1956)
- Headquarters: Akihabara UDX, 14-1, Sotokanda Itchome, Chiyoda, Tokyo, Japan
- Number of locations: 17 in Japan
- Parent: Hitachi, Ltd.
- Website: www.hitachi-cable.co.jp/en/ (in English)

Hitachi Cable, Ltd. (日立電線株式会社, Hitachi Densen Kabushiki-gaisha) is a Japanese electric wire and cable manufacturing company. It was formed from Hitachi Densen Works, the Hitachi Works spin-off previously known as Densen Works.

== History ==
The company was established in 1956 as a manufacturer of electric wire and cable for power distribution. In the half-century following the creation of the company Hitachi Cables have expanded its business operations to include the manufacture of rubber, copper cable, and optical products. Although the company still actively engages in the development of raw materials for wires and cables, it has incorporated the development of telecommunications equipment into its product line. To that end, the product line now includes antennas and coaxial cables, compound semiconductors and various electronic components, including a terminal antenna for wireless communication. The company has also developed the WirelessIP5000, a Wireless IP phone that supports the Session Initiation Protocol (SIP).

As a related push into the IT arena, has developed the Apresia18020, Japan's first Terabit network switch, which has a switching capacity of 1.8 Terabits per second. The company is also one of more than a score of companies that support the consortium known as the 10 Gigabit Ethernet Alliance, along with other top wire & cable Manufacturers like Belden, General Cable, and 1X Technologies.

== Subsidiaries ==
Hitachi Cable Manchester, Inc. (now known as Proterial Cable America, Inc.)
- Industry: Industrial conglomerates
- Founded: 1987
- Headquarters: Manchester, New Hampshire, United States
- Products: copper premises cable, fiber optic electronics round cable, electrical ribbon cable
- Website: www.hcm.hitachi.com

=== Hitachi Cable Manchester, Inc. (HCM) ===
Hitachi Cable Manchester, Inc. (was acquired by Bain Capital in January 2022, and is now known as Proterial Cable America, Inc.) is a manufacturer of premises telecommunications, optical fiber and electronics cables headquartered in Manchester, New Hampshire, and part of the Hitachi Cable division.

=== Products ===
- Copper premises cable: Category 6A UTP, Category 6A F/UTP, Category 6 UTP, Category 5e UTP, Category 5e and 6 outdoor, Category 6 GoldLAN hybrid, Category 5e GoldLAN hybrid, Category 5e power sum multi pair, Category 3 power sum multi pair, composite, ScTP, under carpet, and UTP cable.
- Fiber optic cable: Indoor interconnect, indoor multi-unit, indoor single-unit, indoor loose tube no-gel, indoor/outdoor central tube, indoor/outdoor loose tube, indoor/outdoor tight buffered multimode/singlemode, outside plant armored, and outside plant loose tube fiber optic cable.
- Electronic round cable: Coaxial, general purpose 24AWG, HDMI, IEEE 1284, IEEE 1394, Infiniband, probe, SCSI, Serial ATA, USB, and VGA electronic round cable.
- Electronic ribbon cable: Multicolor planar, microzip planar, PVC ribbonized MCX, SCSI micro quick twist, shielded, and wide pitch planar ribbon cable.
