= Applied Micro Circuits Corporation =

iOS 16

- Type: Public:
- Traded as: Nasdaq: AMCC
- Industry: Semiconductors & Related Devices
- Founded: 1979; 47 years ago
- Defunct: January 26, 2017; 9 years ago
- Fate: Acquired by MACOM Technology Solutions
- Headquarters: Santa Clara, California, US
- Key people: Paramesh Gopi (CEO)
- Revenue: ▲US$206 million (FY 2010)
- Operating income: ▼US$-26.1 million (FY 2010)
- Net income: ▼US$-7.49 million (FY 2010)
- Total assets: ▼US$316 million (FY 2010)
- Total equity: ▼US$281 million (FY 2010)
- Number of employees: ~600
- Website: apm.com at the Wayback Machine (archived 2016-05-16)

Applied Micro Circuits Corporation (also known as AppliedMicro, AMCC or APM) was a fabless semiconductor company designing network and embedded Power ISA (including a Power ISA license), and server processor ARM (including an ARMv8-A license), optical transport and storage products.

== History ==
In 2004, AMCC bought assets, IP and engineers concerning the PowerPC 400 microprocessors from IBM for $227 million and began marketing the processors under its own name. The deal also included access to IBM's SoC design methodology and advanced CMOS process technology.

In 2009, AppliedMicro changed its branding from AMCC to AppliedMicro, but still retain the name "Applied Micro Circuits Corporation" officially.

In 2011, AppliedMicro was integral in (co-)developing ARM's first 64 bit-wide AArch64 ISA-extension and became the first company to implement the resulting ARMv8-A architecture with its X-Gene Platform. In November 2012 at ARM TechCon, AppliedMicro demonstrated advanced web search capabilities and the ability to handle big data workloads in an Apache Hadoop software environment with the X-Gene Platform using FPGA emulation. A silicon implementation of X-Gene was first exhibited publicly in June 2013.

In April 2016, information about the forthcoming X-Gene 3 server chips was made available. The release schedule was for the second half of 2017. The company projected an improved performance, over the X-Gene 2, that with allow it to better compete with servers using the x86-64 architecture.

In November 2016, MACOM Technology Solutions announced that it would purchase AppliedMicro. The acquisition was completed on January 26, 2017. MACOM then sold the processor division to the private equity firm The Carlyle Group during October 2017.

== Memberships ==
AppliedMicro has a sponsor level membership of Power.org and is one of the original members. AppliedMicro is also executive member (chairman position) of the Ethernet Alliance. AppliedMicro is also a member of the Open Compute Project.

== Business groups ==
=== Processor products ===
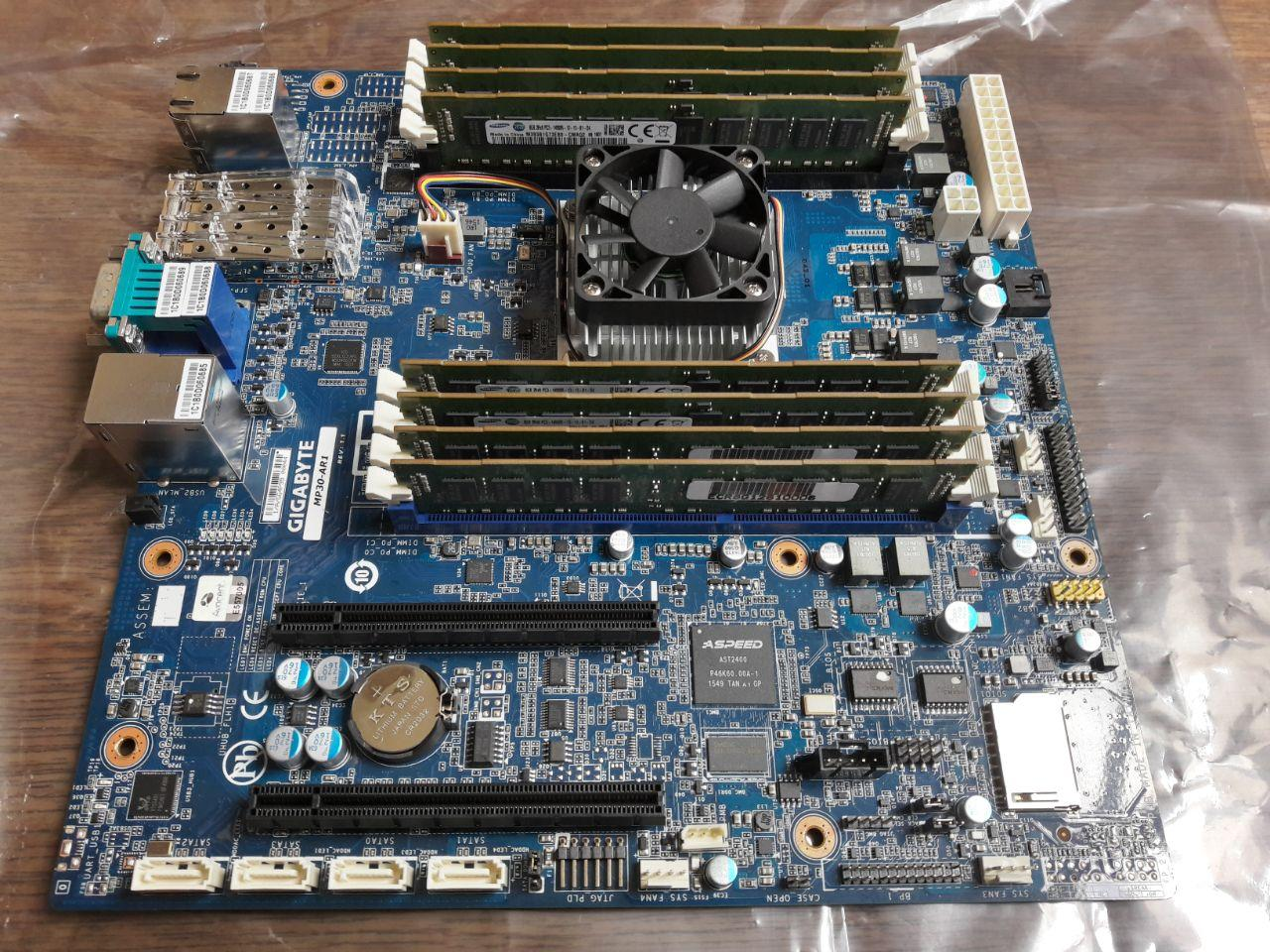
X-Gene based Gigabyte motherboard

The Processor Products group designed and marketed embedded microcontrollers as well as server processor, packet and storage processors. It included the network processors of former MMC Networks (acquired October 2000) with IBM PowerPC 4xx series microcontrollers (acquired April 2004).

Since acquiring the IBM PowerPC 400 family (marketed under the 405 and 440 series product names), AppliedMicro further developed the 460 series, which integrates the 440 CPU and multicore Power architecture devices.

In January 2008, the AppliedMicro PowerPC 405EX was awarded Product of the Year 2007, by Electronic Product magazine.

In October 2011, AppliedMicro announced its X-Gene Platform, an ARM 64-bit solution aimed at cloud and enterprise servers.

=== Connectivity products group ===
The Connectivity Products group of AppliedMicro designs, manufacturers and markets physical layer devices, framers/mappers and switch fabric devices.

== Acquisitions ==
Throughout the years, AppliedMicro has acquired smaller companies to enter new markets.

Date	Acquired company	Expertise	Amount
April 1998	Ten Mountain Design	transceiver design	
March 1999	Cimaron Communications	SONET chips	$115M in stock
April 2000	Yuni Networks	terabit switch fabrics	$241M in stock
April 2000	Chameleon Technologies	Fibre Channel and SONET products	
April 2000	PBaud Logic Inc.	SONET and forward-error-correction	
September 2000	Silutia	CMOS mixed-signal design	566,000 shares of stock
October 2000	MMC Networks	network processors	$4500M in stock
March 2001	Raleigh Technology Corporation (RTC)	Ethernet QoS ASICs	
September 2003	PowerPRS product line from IBM	switch fabrics	$47M
December 2003	JNI	Fibre Channel products	$196M in cash
April 2004	PowerPC 400 series product line from IBM	embedded microprocessors	$227M in cash
April 2004	3ware	RAID controllers	$150M in cash
August 2006	Quake Technologies	10 Gb Ethernet transceivers	$69M in cash
August 2010	TPACK A/S, Copenhagen, Denmark	Optical Transport-Network (OTN), Carrier-class silicon packet-transport	$32 million in cash + ≤$5 million in earn-outs

== Class-action lawsuit ==
In 2005, the company paid $60 million to settle a class-action lawsuit on behalf of investors against the company, including current and former officers and directors. The suit had charged the company with issuing a series of materially false and misleading statements concerning the company's operations and prospects for Q4 2001 and beyond. Under the terms of the settlement, the company and defendants denied any wrongdoing. About half of the amount of the settlement was covered by insurance.
