= Ethernet Alliance =

Internet working group

- Formation: 2005
- Type: Industry trade group
- Purpose: Promoting Ethernet
- Website: ethernetalliance.org

The Ethernet Alliance is an industry consortium founded in 2005 to promote and support Ethernet.

== Organization ==
The Ethernet Alliance work groups are called subcommittees. These subcommittees are focused on efforts around specific standards-based Ethernet initiatives. These standards can be developed in any Ethernet standards body, including the Institute of Electrical and Electronics Engineers (IEEE), the Internet Engineering Task Force (IETF), the Small Form Factor committee as well as supporting standards from organizations such as the Optical Internetworking Forum, the Telecommunications Industry Association (TIA), and the International Organization for Standardization (ISO) and International Electrotechnical Commission (IEC).

As of March 2011, the working subcommittees within the Ethernet Alliance included:

- 10G EPON focuses on the support of IEEE Std. 802.3av-2009 that extended the speed of EPON networks to 10 Gbit/s.
- 10GBASE-T supports IEEE Std. 802.3an-2006 which defined a specification for running 10 Gigabit Ethernet over twisted-pair copper designated 10GBASE-T.
- Carrier Ethernet helps guide work being done to support the specific, evolving and growing demands of Ethernet from carriers and service providers.
- Energy-Efficient Ethernet (EEE) work is largely based up EEE Standard 802.3az-2010.
- Ethernet in the Data Center focus includes protocols such as Data Center Bridging (DCB), Fibre Channel over Ethernet (FCoE), iSCSI, Remote direct memory access over Converged Ethernet (RoCE) and iWARP.
- Higher Speed Ethernet encompasses all aspects of 40 Gbit/s and 100 Gbit/s Ethernet largely based op the work of IEEE Std. 802.3ab-2010.
- Next Generation Enterprise Cabling whose goal is to gather and analyze data relative to observed deployment models, applications, and reaches, and then to share that information via a white paper with Ethernet Alliance members and standards bodies.
- Power over Ethernet and Power over Ethernet Plus promotes the current capabilities of IEEE802.3at-2009, as well driving consensus with efforts to extend the power delivery and port-level resiliency capabilities of IEEE802.3at in the Ethernet community.
- High Speed Modular Interconnects helps drive the adoption through demonstrating interoperability of compliant HS Modular Interconnect devices and ports including optical modules and copper cables.

== History ==
In previous Ethernet technology iterations, an alliance was formed to support the adoption of that new technology into the market. The Ethernet Alliance was preceded by the Fast Ethernet Alliance, the Gigabit Ethernet Alliance (GEA), the 10 Gigabit Ethernet Alliance (10 GEA), and the Ethernet in the First Mile Alliance (EFMA). These alliances would dissolve a few years after the completion of the standards effort they supported. Unfortunately, this was often long before the technology would reach volume adoption and there was seldom support for smaller Ethernet standards projects. Brad Booth noticed that upon the dissolution of the 10GEA that there was still a strong desire by the end users and media for information about 10 Gigabit Ethernet and some of the new technology being created for 10 Gigabit Ethernet, primarily 10GBASE-T. He worked with others in the industry and the standards bodies to create an alliance that would exist as long as Ethernet technology existed. The Ethernet Alliance was formed with the goal to support IEEE 802 Ethernet standards, but later expanded its scope to include all standards that rely upon or are dependent upon IEEE 802 Ethernet standards.

The Road to 100G Alliance was formally announced on June 19, 2007 at the NXTcomm 2007 show in Chicago, Illinois to promote 100 Gigabit Ethernet. The founding members were Bay Microsystems, Enigma Semiconductor, Integrated Device Technology, IP Infusion (part of the Access Company), and Lattice Semiconductor. It was headquartered in the Silicon Valley area of California.

With the expanded charter and the formation of the HSE and Carrier Ethernet subcommittees, the Road to 100G alliance merged with the Ethernet Alliance on December 31, 2008.

There were eighteen founding members of the Ethernet Alliance: 3Com (now HP), ADC (now Tyco Electronics), Agere Systems (now LSI), Applied Micro Circuits Corporation (now AppliedMicro), Aquantia, Broadcom, Force10 Networks (now Dell), Foundry Networks (now Brocade), Intel, Lawrence Berkeley National Laboratory, Pioneer Corporation, Quake Technologies (now AppliedMicro), Samsung, Sun Microsystems (now Oracle Corporation), Tehuti Networks, Tyco Electronics (now TE Connectivity), the University of New Hampshire InterOperability Laboratory (UNH-IOL), and Xilinx.

== Education ==
The Ethernet Alliance offers white papers, presentations, frequently asked questions and videos that provide comprehensive technical overviews of many different Ethernet technologies. These materials are available on the Ethernet Alliance public website and are available free of charge.

These papers provide educational materials with an industry-based perspective. They may be based upon the work of Ethernet Alliance subcommittees or support the activities inside Ethernet standards bodies. The papers are intended to help buyers and users of Ethernet technologies better understand the status of various Ethernet technologies in the standards process, the interoperability tests that the Ethernet Alliance has tested, the capabilities of these technologies and much more.

In addition to the library, the Ethernet Alliance gives members discounted or complimentary entrance to events, holds public demonstrations of various Ethernet technologies at trade shows where those interested in learning more about Ethernet can ask questions face-to-face and hosts Ethernet Alliance sponsored events called Technology Exploration Forums, or TEFs. TEFs offer face-to-face events to bring together members of the various Ethernet communities to discuss and explore the future of Ethernet technology. The Ethernet Alliance offers an opportunity for academic institutions to become involved in the organization for no fee. The Ethernet Alliance University Program (EAUP), allows professors and students to become involved in the organization and have access to member generated data, collaborate on educational materials, students can participate in an internship program and universities can contribute to the EAUP Intellectual Property Data Base.

== See also ==
- Ethernet Technology Consortium
