= C form-factor pluggable =

The C form-factor pluggable (CFP, 100G form factor pluggable, where C is Latin: centum "hundred") is a multi-source agreement to produce a common form-factor for the transmission of high-speed digital signals. The c stands for the Latin letter C used to express the number 100 (centum), since the standard was primarily developed for 100 Gigabit Ethernet systems.

== CFP standardization ==
The CFP transceiver is specified by a multi-source agreement (MSA) among competing manufacturers. The CFP was designed after the Small Form-factor Pluggable transceiver (SFP) interface, but is significantly larger to support 100 Gbit/s. While the electrical connection of a CFP uses 10 × 10 Gbit/s lanes in each direction (RX, TX), the optical connection can support both 10 × 10 Gbit/s and 4 × 25 Gbit/s variants of 100 Gbit/s interconnects (typically referred to as 100GBASE-SR10 in 100 meter MMF, 100GBASE-LR10 and 100GBASE-LR4 in 10 km SMF reach, and 100GBASE-ER10 and 100GBASE-ER4 in 40 km SMF reach respectively.)

In March 2009, Santur Corporation demonstrated a 100 Gigabit pluggable CFP transceiver prototype.

== Supported signals ==
=== Digital ===
CFP transceivers can support a single 100 Gbit/s signal like 100GbE or OTU4 or one or more 40 Gbit/s signals like 40GbE, OTU3, or STM-256/OC-768.

=== Analog ===
The Optical Internetworking Forum in 2016 published the CFP2-ACO or CFP2 - Analog Coherent Optics Module Interoperability Agreement (IA). This IA supports a configuration where the digital signal processor (DSP) is on the main board and analog optical components are on the module. This IA is useful in the case when the DSP exceeds the module power envelope.

The ACO interface can be used in coherent optics applications when the link delivers a flexible amount of bandwidth to the system, for example when combined with FlexE. The initial ACO IA is for the CFP2 module.

== Variants ==
The original CFP specification was proposed at a time when 10 Gbit/s signals were far more achievable than 25 Gbit/s signals. As such to achieve 100 Gbit/s line rate, the most affordable solution was based on 10 lanes of 10 Gbit/s. However, as expected, improvements in technology have allowed higher performance and higher density. Hence the development of the CFP2 and CFP4 specifications. While electrically similar, they specify a form-factor of 1/2 and 1/4 respectively in size of the original specification. Note that CFP, CFP2 and CFP4 modules are not interchangeable (but are inter-operable at the optical interface with appropriate connectors).

=== CFP ===
- 82 mm × 13.6 mm × 144.8 mm (width×height×depth)
- 148 pin electrical connection
- integrated digital signal processor within package
- less than 24 W power usage
- 10×10G or 4×25G lanes

=== CFP2 ===
- 41.5 mm × 12.4 mm × 107.5 mm (w×h×d)
- 104 pin electrical connection
- Default/ACO version (Analog Coherent Optics): no DSP in module, relies on host card
- DCO version (Digital Coherent Optics): DSP in module
- less than 12 W power usage
- 10×10G, 4×25G, 8×25G, or 8×50G lanes

=== CFP4 ===
- 21.5 mm × 9.5 mm × 92 mm (w×h×d)
- 56 pin electrical connection
- no digital signal processor in package, relies on host card
- less than 6 W power usage
- 4×10G or 4×25G lanes

=== CFP8 ===
- 40 mm × 9.5 mm × 102 mm (w×h×d)
- 124 pin electrical connection
- no digital signal processor in package, relies on host card
- max. 24 W power usage
- 16×25G lanes (25.78125 or 26.5625 GBd) or 8×50G lanes

=== MSA 5″×7″ (Gen 1) ===
- 168 pin electrical connection (designed to be built into a line card)
- digital signal processor within package
- less than 80 W power usage

=== MSA 4″×5″ (Gen 2) ===
- 168 pin electrical connection (designed to be built into a line card)
- digital signal processor within package
- less than 40 W power usage

== See also ==
- QSFP
- CXP (connector)
