= 100 Gigabit Ethernet =

Technologies for computer networking

40 Gigabit Ethernet (40GbE) and 100 Gigabit Ethernet (100GbE) are groups of computer networking technologies for transmitting Ethernet frames at rates of 40 and 100 gigabits per second (Gbit/s), respectively. These technologies offer significantly higher speeds than 10 Gigabit Ethernet. The technology was first defined by the IEEE 802.3ba-2010 standard and later by the 802.3bg-2011, 802.3bj-2014, 802.3bm-2015, and 802.3cd-2018 standards. The first succeeding Terabit Ethernet specifications were approved in 2017.

The standards define numerous port types with different optical and electrical interfaces and different numbers of optical fiber strands per port. Short distances (e.g. 7 m) over twinaxial cable are supported, while standards for fiber reach up to 80 km.

== Standards ==
The IEEE 802.3 working group is concerned with the maintenance and extension of the Ethernet data communications standard. Additions to the 802.3 standard are performed by task forces which are designated by one or two letters. For example, the 802.3z task force drafted the original Gigabit Ethernet standard.

802.3ba is the designation given to the higher-speed Ethernet task force, which completed its work to modify the 802.3 standard to support speeds higher than 10 Gbit/s in 2010.

The speeds chosen by 802.3ba were 40 and 100 Gbit/s to support both end-point and link aggregation needs, respectively. This was the first time two different Ethernet speeds were specified in a single standard. The decision to include both speeds came from pressure to support the 40 Gbit/s rate for local server applications and the 100 Gbit/s rate for internet backbones. The standard was announced in July 2007 and was ratified on June 17, 2010.

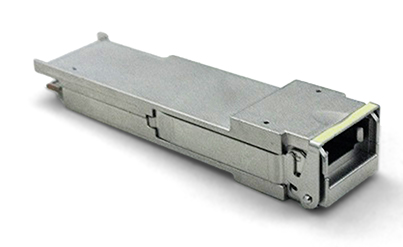
A 40G-SR4 transceiver in the QSFP form factor

The 40/100 Gigabit Ethernet standards encompass a number of different Ethernet physical layer (PHY) specifications. A networking device may support different PHY types by means of pluggable modules. Optical modules are not standardized by any official standards body but are in multi-source agreements (MSAs). One agreement that supports 40 and 100 Gigabit Ethernet is the CFP MSA which was adopted for distances of 100+ meters. QSFP and CXP connector modules support shorter distances.

The standard supports only full-duplex operation. Other objectives include:

- Preserve the 802.3 Ethernet frame format utilizing the 802.3 MAC
- Preserve minimum and maximum frame size specified in the 802.3 standard
- Support a bit error rate (BER) better than or equal to 10^{−12} at the MAC/PLS service interface
- Provide appropriate support for OTN
- Support MAC data rates of 40 and 100 Gbit/s
- Provide physical layer specifications (PHY) for operation over single-mode optical fiber (SMF), laser optimized multi-mode optical fiber (MMF) OM3 and OM4, copper cable assembly, and backplane.

The following nomenclature is used for the physical layers:

Physical layer	40 Gigabit Ethernet	100 Gigabit Ethernet
Backplane	—N/a	100GBASE-KP4
Improved Backplane	40GBASE-KR4	100GBASE-KR4; 100GBASE-KR2
7 m over twinax copper cable	40GBASE-CR4	100GBASE-CR10; 100GBASE-CR4; 100GBASE-CR2
30 m over Category 8 twisted pair	40GBASE-T	—N/a
100 m over OM3 MMF	40GBASE-SR4	100GBASE-SR10; 100GBASE-SR4; 100GBASE-SR2
125 m over OM4 MMF	40GBASE-SR4	100GBASE-SR10; 100GBASE-SR4; 100GBASE-SR2
500 m over SMF, serial	—N/a	100GBASE-DR
2 km over SMF, serial	40GBASE-FR	100GBASE-FR1
10 km over SMF	40GBASE-LR4	100GBASE-LR4; 100GBASE-LR1
40 km over SMF	40GBASE-ER4	100GBASE-ER4
80 km over SMF	—N/a	100GBASE-ZR

The 100 m laser-optimized multi-mode fiber (OM3) objective is met by parallel ribbon cable with 850 nm wavelength 10GBASE-SR-like optics (40GBASE-SR4 and 100GBASE-SR10). The backplane objective is met with 4 lanes of 10GBASE-KR type PHYs (40GBASE-KR4). The copper cable objective is met with 4 or 10 differential lanes using SFF-8642 and SFF-8436 connectors. The 10 and 40 km 100 Gbit/s objectives with four wavelengths (around 1310 nm) of 25 Gbit/s optics (100GBASE-LR4 and 100GBASE-ER4) and the 10 km 40 Gbit/s objective with four wavelengths (around 1310 nm) of 10 Gbit/s optics (40GBASE-LR4).

In January 2010, another IEEE project authorization started a task force to define a 40 Gbit/s serial single-mode optical fiber standard (40GBASE-FR). This was approved as standard 802.3bg in March 2011. It used 1550 nm optics, had a reach of 2 km and was capable of receiving 1550 nm and 1310 nm wavelengths of light. The capability to receive 1310 nm light allows it to interoperate with a longer-reach 1310 nm PHY should one ever be developed. 1550 nm was chosen as the wavelength for 802.3bg transmission to make it compatible with existing test equipment and infrastructure.

In December 2010, a 10x10 multi-source agreement (10x10 MSA) began to define an optical Physical Medium Dependent (PMD) sublayer and establish compatible sources of low-cost, low-power, pluggable optical transceivers based on 10 optical lanes at 10 Gbit/s each. The 10x10 MSA was intended as a lower cost alternative to 100GBASE-LR4 for applications which do not require a link length longer than 2 km. It was intended for use with standard single-mode G.652.C/D type low water peak cable with ten wavelengths ranging from 1523 to 1595 nm. The founding members were Google, Brocade Communications, JDSU and Santur. Other member companies of the 10x10 MSA included MRV, Enablence, Cyoptics, AFOP, oplink, Hitachi Cable America, AMS-IX, EXFO, Huawei, Kotura, Facebook and Effdon when the 2 km specification was announced in March 2011. The 10X10 MSA modules were intended to be the same size as the CFP specifications.

On June 12, 2014, the 802.3bj standard was approved. The 802.3bj standard specifies 100 Gbit/s 4x25G PHYs - 100GBASE-KR4, 100GBASE-KP4 and 100GBASE-CR4 - for backplane and twin-ax cable.

On February 16, 2015, the 802.3bm standard was approved. The 802.3bm standard specifies a lower-cost optical 100GBASE-SR4 PHY for MMF and a four-lane chip-to-module and chip-to-chip electrical specification (CAUI-4). The detailed objectives for the 802.3bm project can be found on the 802.3 website.

On May 14, 2018, the 802.3ck project was approved. This has objectives to:

- Define a single-lane 100 Gbit/s Attachment Unit interface (AUI) for chip-to-module applications, compatible with PMDs based on 100 Gbit/s per lane optical signaling (100GAUI-1 C2M)
- Define a single-lane 100 Gbit/s Attachment Unit Interface (AUI) for chip-to-chip applications (100GAUI-1 C2C)
- Define a single-lane 100 Gbit/s PHY for operation over electrical backplanes supporting an insertion loss ≤ 28 dB at 26.56 GHz (100GBASE-KR1).
- Define a single-lane 100 Gbit/s PHY for operation over twin-axial copper cables with lengths up to at least 2 m (100GBASE-CR1).

On November 12, 2018, the IEEE P802.3ct Task Force started working to define PHY supporting 100 Gbit/s operation on a single wavelength capable of at least 80 km over a DWDM system (100GBASE-ZR) (using a combination of phase and amplitude modulation with coherent detection).

On December 5, 2018, the 802.3cd standard was approved. The 802.3cd standard specifies PHYs using 50 Gbit/s lanes - 100GBASE-KR2 for backplane, 100GBASE-CR2 for twin-ax cable, 100GBASE-SR2 for MMF and using 100 Gbit/s signalling 100GBASE-DR for SMF.

In June 2020, the IEEE P802.3db Task Force started working to define a physical layer specification that supports 100 Gbit/s operation over 1 pair of MMF with lengths up to at least 50 m.

On February 11, 2021, the IEEE 802.3cu standard was approved. The IEEE 802.3cu standard defines single-wavelength 100 Gbit/s PHYs for operation over SMF (Single-Mode Fiber) with lengths of at least 2 km (100GBASE-FR1) and 10 km (100GBASE-LR1).

== 40G/100G pluggable module types ==
The electrical and physical interface on devices implementing 100 Gigabit Ethernet has undergone a process of miniaturization, as has been seen on older generations of Ethernet.

Name	Introduction	40GE	100GE Electrical interfaces				Management interface	Physically large enough for MPO optical connectors	Notes
Name	Introduction	XLAUI 4× 10.3125 Gbaud NRZ	CAUI 10× 10.3125 Gbaud NRZ	CAUI-4 OIF-CEI-28G-VSR 4× 25.78125 Gbaud NRZ	OIF-CEI-56G-VSR-PAM4 2× 26.5625 Gbaud PAM-4	OIF-CEI-112G-VSR-PAM4 1× 53.125 Gbaud PAM-4	Management interface	Physically large enough for MPO optical connectors	Notes
Single-issue form factors
CXP	Unknown	Yes	Yes	No	No	No	Unknown	Yes	historical, limited standardization
CPAK	Unknown	No	No	Yes	No	No	Unknown	Yes	historical, limited standardization
CFP	2009	Yes	Yes	No	No	No	MDIO	Yes	Generally phased out, but still seen for very high power or coherent optical transceivers.
CFP2	2013	Yes	Yes	Yes	400GE	No	MDIO	Yes	Specification includes 400G usage (8 × 25.78125 Gbaud × PAM4). Generally phased out, but still seen for very high power or coherent optical transceivers.
CFP4	2014	Yes	No	Yes	No	No	MDIO	Yes	Generally phased out.
microQSFP	2016	Yes	No	Yes	No	No	I²C	Yes	
DSFP	2018	No	No	No	Yes	No	I²C	Unknown	
Multi-generation form factors
QSFP family	no suffix	QSFP+	No	QSFP28 (2014)	QSFP56; 2× (2017)	QSFP112; 4× (2021)	I²C	Yes	QSFP28 is the most common form factor as of 2026. Slower/older transceivers can frequently (but not always) be used in faster ports.
QSFP family	-DD (Note: The -DD variants in the QSFP and SFP families feature double-row connectors, giving them twice the electrical lane count and thus "Double Density". A -DD slot can accept a non-DD module, platform support for operating that transceiver is likely but not guaranteed.)	Unknown	No	QSFP-DD (Note: The initial version of QSFP-DD already supported 8× 56 Gbd = 448 Gbd total. Operation at half that speed is sometimes available.); 2×/4× (2016)		QSFP-DD800; 8× (2021)	I²C	Yes	QSFP28 is the most common form factor as of 2026. Slower/older transceivers can frequently (but not always) be used in faster ports.
SFP family	no suffix	No	No	No	No	SFP112 (2021)	I²C	No	Hosts are commonly backwards compatible with SFP/SFP28 modules for 10GE and 25GE operation.
SFP family	-DD	No	No	No	SFP56-DD (2017)	200GE	I²C	No	Hosts are commonly backwards compatible with SFP/SFP28 modules for 10GE and 25GE operation.
OSFP family		No	No	Unknown	OSFP; 4× (2017)	OSFP800; 8× (2021)	I²C	Yes ×2	

Multipliers in this table indicate the given module would be able to provide the given number of 100GE interfaces. This usage is common with breakout cabling, but must be supported by the platform. The higher the breakout ratio is, the less commonly it is supported, and these ports would normally be used for 400GE or 800GE.

The electrical interface listed above doesn't necessarily tie into a symbol rate or encoding on optical media. A module may implement a gearbox to covert between encodings, sometimes even regenerating or converting between forward error correction schemes. For SFP and QSFP form factors, this was initially too power hungry but is now not uncommon.

Optical transceivers supporting multiple symbol rates exist but are, while not rare, somewhat uncommon. On the host side, multi-rate ports are relatively common, meaning module slots can accept older/slower modules within the same physical form factor. However, support differs across platforms, and some can only switch rates for a group of several ports at once, i.e., all ports within the group must use the same symbol rate.

== 100G interface types ==
In theory, any optical interface standard could be implemented in any form factor module, although the front surface of SFP modules is too small to fit an MPO connector. However, not all combinations have been manufactured. The list of available optical standards is:

Legend for fibre-based PHYs
Fibre type	Introduced	Performance
MMF FDDI 62.5/125 µm	1987	160 MHz·km @ 850 nm
MMF OM1 62.5/125 µm	1989	200 MHz·km @ 850 nm
MMF OM2 50/125 µm	1998	500 MHz·km @ 850 nm
MMF OM3 50/125 µm	2003	1500 MHz·km @ 850 nm
MMF OM4 50/125 µm	2008	3500 MHz·km @ 850 nm
MMF OM5 50/125 µm	2016	3500 MHz·km @ 850 nm and 1850 MHz·km @ 950 nm
SMF OS1 9/125 µm	1998	1.0 dB/km @ 1300/1550 nm
SMF OS2 9/125 µm	2000	0.4 dB/km @ 1300/1550 nm

Name	Standard	Status	Media	Connector	Reach in m	# Media (⇆) (Note: Total number of physical media (copper diffpairs/fibre strands) needed for a link, including both directions.)	# Lambdas (→) (Note: Number of wavelengths transmitted into one fibre strand by one end.)	Notes
100 Gigabit Ethernet (100 GbE) (1st Generation: 10GbE-based)
Links of this generation does not support any FEC. Line code: 64b/66b × NRZ - Line rate: 10 lanes × 10.3125 GBd = 103.125 Gbit/s (raw)
100GBASE-CR10; Direct Attach	802.3ba-2010 (CL85)	phase-out	twinaxial balanced	CXP (SFF-8642); CFP2; CFP4; QSFP+	7	20	N/A	Data centers (inter-rack); CXP connector uses center 10 out of 12 channels.
100GBASE-SR10	802.3ba-2010 (CL82/86)	phase-out	Fibre; 850 nm	MPO/MTP (MPO-24)	OM3: 100	20	1	
100GBASE-SR10	802.3ba-2010 (CL82/86)	phase-out	Fibre; 850 nm	MPO/MTP (MPO-24)	OM4: 150	20	1	
10×10G	proprietary (MSA, Jan 2010)	phase-out	Fibre; 1523 nm, 1531 nm, 1539 nm, 1547 nm, 1555 nm, 1563 nm, 1571 nm, 1579 nm, 1587 nm, 1595 nm	LC	OSx: 2k, 10k, 40k	2	10 (WDM)	Multi-vendor standard
100 Gigabit Ethernet (100 GbE) (2nd Generation: 25GbE-based)
Specified to not use any FEC: Line code: 64b/66b × NRZ - Line rate: 4 lanes × 25.78125 GBd = 103.125 Gbit/s (raw)
100GBASE-LR4	802.3ba-2010 (CL88)	current	Fibre; 1295.56 nm 1300.05 nm 1304.59 nm 1309.14 nm	LC	OSx: 10k	2	4 (WDM)	
100GBASE-ER4	802.3ba-2010 (CL88)	current	Fibre; 1295.56 nm 1300.05 nm 1304.59 nm 1309.14 nm	LC	OSx: 40k	2	4 (WDM)	
FEC mandatory by specification: Line code: RS-FEC(544,514) × PAM4 × 92/90 framing and 31320/31280 lane identification - Line rate: 4 lanes × 13.59375 GBd ×2 (bit/sym) = 108.75 Gbit/s (raw)
100GBASE-KP4	802.3bj-2014 (CL94)	current	Cu-Backplane	—N/a	1	8	N/A	PCBs; total insertion loss of up to 33 dB at 7 GHz
FEC mandatory by specification: Line code: 256b/257b × RS-FEC(528,514) × NRZ - Line rate: 4 lanes × 25.78125 GBd = 103.125 Gbit/s (raw)
100GBASE-KR4	802.3bj-2014 (CL93)	current	Cu-Backplane	—N/a	1	8	N/A	PCBs; total insertion loss of up to 35 dB at 12.9 GHz
100GBASE-CR4; Direct Attach	802.3bj-2010 (CL92)	current	twinaxial balanced	QSFP28 (SFF-8665); CFP2; CFP4	5	8	N/A	Data centers (inter-rack)
100GBASE-SR4	802.3bm-2015 (CL95)	current	Fibre; 850 nm	MPO/MTP (MPO-12)	OM3: 70	8	1	
100GBASE-SR4	802.3bm-2015 (CL95)	current	Fibre; 850 nm	MPO/MTP (MPO-12)	OM4: 100	8	1	
100GBASE-CWDM4	proprietary (MSA, Mar 2014)	current	Fibre; 1271 nm 1291 nm 1311 nm 1331 nm ±6.5 nm each	LC	OSx: 2k	2	4 (WDM)	Data centers; FEC mandatory
FEC optional or unspecified: Line code: 256b/257b × RS-FEC(528,514) × NRZ - Line rate: 4 lanes × 25.78125 GBd = 103.125 Gbit/s (raw): or -; Line code: 64b/66b × NRZ - Line rate: 4 lanes × 25.78125 GBd = 103.125 Gbit/s (raw)
100GBASE-SWDM4	proprietary (MSA, Nov 2017)	current	Fibre; 851 nm 881 nm 911 nm 941 nm ±7 nm each	LC	OM3: 75	2	4 (WDM)	SWDM
100GBASE-SWDM4	proprietary (MSA, Nov 2017)	current	Fibre; 851 nm 881 nm 911 nm 941 nm ±7 nm each	LC	OM4: 100	2	4 (WDM)	SWDM
100GBASE-SWDM4	proprietary (MSA, Nov 2017)	current	Fibre; 851 nm 881 nm 911 nm 941 nm ±7 nm each	LC	OM5: 150	2	4 (WDM)	SWDM
100GBASE-PSM4	proprietary (MSA, Jan 2014)	current	Fibre; 1310 nm	MPO/MTP (MPO-12)	OSx: 500	8	1	Data centers; FEC optional
100GBASE-4WDM-10	proprietary (MSA, Oct 2018)	current	Fibre; 1271 nm 1291 nm 1311 nm 1331 nm ±6.5 nm each	LC	OSx: 10k	2	4 (WDM)	FEC specification unknown Multi-vendor standard
100GBASE-4WDM-20	proprietary (MSA, Jul 2017)	current	Fibre; 1295.56 nm 1300.05 nm 1304.58 nm 1309.14 nm ±1.03 nm each	LC	OSx: 20k	2	4 (WDM)	FEC specification unknown Multi-vendor standard
100GBASE-4WDM-40	proprietary (non IEEE) (MSA, Jul 2017)	current	Fibre; 1295.56 nm 1300.05 nm 1304.58 nm 1309.14 nm ±1.03 nm each	LC	OSx: 40k	2	4 (WDM)	FEC specification unknown Multi-vendor standard
100GBASE-CLR4	proprietary (MSA, Apr 2014)	current	Fibre; 1271 nm 1291 nm 1311 nm 1331 nm ±6.5 nm each	LC	OSx: 2k	2	4 (WDM)	Data centers; FEC optional Interoperable with 100GBASE-CWDM4 when using RS-FEC; Multi-vendor standard
Unknown	proprietary (OCP MSA, Mar 2014)	possibly never matured to production	Fibre; 1504 – 1566 nm	LC	OSx: 2k	2	4 (WDM)	Data centers; FEC specification unknown Derived from 100GBASE-CWDM4 to allow cheaper transceivers; Multi-vendor standard
100 Gigabit Ethernet (100 GbE) (3rd Generation: 50GbE-based)
FEC required by specification: Line code: 256b/257b × RS-FEC(544,514) × PAM4 - Line rate: 2 lanes × 26.5625 GBd ×2 (bits/sym) = 106.25 Gbit/s (raw)
100GBASE-KR2	802.3cd-2018 (CL137)	current	Cu-Backplane	—N/a	1	4	N/A	PCBs
100GBASE-CR2	802.3cd-2018 (CL136)	current	twinaxial balanced	QSFP28, microQSFP, QSFP-DD, OSFP (SFF-8665)	3	4	N/A	Data centers (in-rack)
100GBASE-SR2	802.3cd-2018 (CL138)	current	Fibre; 850 nm	MPO; 2× CS duplex 4 fibres	OM3: 70	4	1	Not to be confused with "100GBASE-SR2 BiDi", which is a misnomer of SRBD or SR1.2 (see below).
100GBASE-SR2	802.3cd-2018 (CL138)	current	Fibre; 850 nm	MPO; 2× CS duplex 4 fibres	OM4: 100	4	1	Not to be confused with "100GBASE-SR2 BiDi", which is a misnomer of SRBD or SR1.2 (see below).
100GBASE-SR1.2 (Bidirectional)	unspecified but essentially ¼ 400GBASE-SR4.2; 802.3cm-2020 (CL150, de facto)	current	Fibre; 850 nm 900 nm	LC	OM3: 70	2	1 (Note: A 100GBASE-SR1.2 (or 100GBASE-SRBD) transceiver transmits only one wavelength per fiber core, but does so on both strands of the duplex pair. This is done on different wavelengths to avoid interference, since both sides illuminate both fibres of the pair. In theory, an optical circulator can be used in place of WDM (de)multiplexing, utilizing the directionality of this setup. Unlike slower BX/BR bidi transceivers, SR1.2 transceivers do not need to be used in matching pairs of swapped RX/TX wavelengths.) (WDM, bidi) total 2	RS-FEC(544,514) mandatory Duplex fiber with both being used to transmit and receive. The major selling point of this variant is its ability to run over existing LC multi-mode fiber (allowing easy migration from 10G/25G to 100G). This standard is compatible with breakout from 400GBASE-4.2 but is not compatible with 100G-SRBD (see below).
100GBASE-SR1.2 (Bidirectional)	unspecified but essentially ¼ 400GBASE-SR4.2; 802.3cm-2020 (CL150, de facto)	current	Fibre; 850 nm 900 nm	LC	OM4: 100	2	1 (WDM, bidi) total 2	RS-FEC(544,514) mandatory Duplex fiber with both being used to transmit and receive. The major selling point of this variant is its ability to run over existing LC multi-mode fiber (allowing easy migration from 10G/25G to 100G). This standard is compatible with breakout from 400GBASE-4.2 but is not compatible with 100G-SRBD (see below).
100GBASE-SR1.2 (Bidirectional)	unspecified but essentially ¼ 400GBASE-SR4.2; 802.3cm-2020 (CL150, de facto)	current	Fibre; 850 nm 900 nm	LC	OM5: 150	2	1 (WDM, bidi) total 2	RS-FEC(544,514) mandatory Duplex fiber with both being used to transmit and receive. The major selling point of this variant is its ability to run over existing LC multi-mode fiber (allowing easy migration from 10G/25G to 100G). This standard is compatible with breakout from 400GBASE-4.2 but is not compatible with 100G-SRBD (see below).
100GBASE-SRBD (Bidirectional)	proprietary (Cisco)	phase-out	Fibre; 850 nm 900 nm	LC	same as SR1.2	2	1 (WDM, bidi) total 2	SRBD is identical to SR1.2 on the physical/optical level but uses RS-FEC(528,514). This makes SR1.2 and SRBD incompatible with each other. Some SRBD transceivers support dual-speed 40G/100G operation.
100 Gigabit Ethernet (100 GbE) (4th Generation: 100GbE-based)
FEC required by specification: Line code: 256b/257b × RS-FEC(544,514) × PAM4 - Line rate: 1 lane × 53.1250 GBd ×2 (bits/sym) = 106.25 Gbit/s (raw)
100GBASE-KR1	802.3ck-2022 (CL163)	current	Cu-Backplane	—N/a		2	N/A	total insertion loss ≤ 28 dB at 26.56 GHz.
100GBASE-CR1	802.3ck-2022 (CL162)	current	twinaxial balanced	—N/a	2	2	N/A	
100GBASE-VR1	802.3db-2022 (CL167)	current	Fibre; 842 nm ±53 nm	LC	OM3: 30	2	1	
100GBASE-VR1	802.3db-2022 (CL167)	current	Fibre; 842 nm ±53 nm	LC	OM4: 50	2	1	
100GBASE-SR1	802.3db-2022 (CL167)	current	Fibre; 853.5 nm ±9.5 nm	LC	OM3: 60	2	1	
100GBASE-SR1	802.3db-2022 (CL167)	current	Fibre; 853.5 nm ±9.5 nm	LC	OM4: 100	2	1	
100GBASE-DR	802.3cd-2018 (CL140)	current	Fibre; 1311 nm	LC	OSx: 500	2	1	
100GBASE-FR1	802.3cu-2021 (CL140)	current	Fibre; 1311 nm	LC	OSx: 2k	2	1	Multi-vendor standard
100GBASE-LR1	802.3cu-2021 (CL140)	current	Fibre; 1311 nm	LC	OSx: 10k	2	1	Multi-vendor standard
100GBASE-LR1-20	proprietary (MSA, Nov 2020)	current	Fibre; 1311 nm	LC	OSx: 20k	2	1	Multi-vendor standard
100GBASE-ER1-30	proprietary (MSA, Nov 2020)	current	Fibre; 1311 nm	LC	OSx: 30k	2	1	Multi-vendor standard
100GBASE-ER1-40	proprietary (MSA, Nov 2020)	current	Fibre; 1311 nm	LC	OSx: 40k	2	1	Multi-vendor standard
100GBASE-PR/BR	P802.3dk	future development in progress at IEEE	Fibre not specified yet	LC simplex	likely: OSx: 40k	1	1 (WDM, bidi)	Non-standard transceivers of this general type already exist, using e.g. directional pairs of 1291 nm + 1311 nm (CWDM grid) or 1309nm + 1305 nm (DWDM grid).
FEC required by specification: Line code: 64b/66b × SC-FEC(255,227)(3800,4080) × DP-QPSK - Line rate: 4 lanes × 5 bit streams × 4.97664 GBit/s (Note: This corresponds to 27 · 18.432 MHz, a typical telecomms clock frequency.) (asynchronous) × 255/227 ≈ 27.9525… GBd × 2 (DP-) × 2 (QPSK) ≈ 111.80997360 Gbit/s (raw) = OTU4 rate / ITU-T G.709
100GBASE-ZR	802.3ct-2021 (CL153/154)	current	Fibre; 1546.119 nm	LC	OS2: 80k+	2	1	Reduced bandwidth and line rate for ultra long distances.

=== Coding schemes ===
10.3125 Gbaud with NRZ ("PAM2") and 64b66b on 10 lanes per direction
One of the earliest coding used, this widens the coding scheme used in single-lane 10GE and quad-lane 40G to use 10 lanes. Due to the low symbol rate, relatively long ranges can be achieved at the cost of using a lot of cabling.
This also allows breakout to 10×10GE, provided that the hardware supports splitting the port.

25.78125 Gbaud with NRZ ("PAM2") and 64b66b on 4 lanes per direction
A sped-up variant of the above, this directly corresponds to 10GE/40GE signalling at 2.5× speed. The higher symbol rate makes links more susceptible to errors.
If the device and transceiver support dual-speed operation, it is possible to reconfigure a 100G port to downspeed to 40G or 4×10G. There is no autonegotiation protocol for this; thus, manual configuration is necessary. Similarly, a port can be broken into 4×25G if implemented in the hardware. This is applicable even for CWDM4, if a CWDM demultiplexer and CWDM 25G optics are used appropriately.

25.78125 Gbaud with NRZ ("PAM2") and RS-FEC(528,514) on 4 lanes per direction
To address the higher susceptibility to errors at these symbol rates, an application of Reed–Solomon error correction was defined in IEEE 802.3bj / Clause 91. This replaces the 64b66b encoding with a 256b257b encoding followed by the RS-FEC application, which results in the exact same overhead as 64b66b. To the optical transceiver or cable, there is no distinction between this and 64b66b; some interface types (e.g., CWDM4) are defined "with or without FEC."

26.5625 Gbaud with PAM4 and RS-FEC(544,514) on 2 lanes per direction
This achieves a further doubling in bandwidth per lane (used to halve the number of lanes) by employing pulse-amplitude modulation with 4 distinct analog levels, making each symbol carry 2 bits. To keep up error margins, the FEC overhead is doubled from 2.7% to 5.8%, which explains the slight rise in symbol rate.

53.125 Gbaud with PAM4 and RS-FEC(544,514) on 1 lane per direction
Further pushing silicon limits, this is a double rate variant of the previous, giving full 100GE operation over 1 medium lane.

30.14475 Gbaud with DP-DQPSK and SD-FEC on 1 lane per direction
Mirroring OTN4 developments, DP-DQPSK (dual polarization differential quadrature phase shift keying) employs polarization to carry one axis of the DP-QPSK constellation. Additionally, new soft-decision FEC algorithms take additional information on analog signal levels as input to the error correction procedure.

13.59375 Gbaud with PAM4, KP4 specific coding and RS-FEC(544,514) on 4 lanes per direction
A half-speed variant of 26.5625 Gbaud with RS-FEC, with a 31320/31280 step encoding the lane number into the signal, and further 92/90 framing.

== 40G interface types ==
Legend for fibre-based PHYs
Fibre type	Introduced	Performance
MMF FDDI 62.5/125 µm	1987	160 MHz·km @ 850 nm
MMF OM1 62.5/125 µm	1989	200 MHz·km @ 850 nm
MMF OM2 50/125 µm	1998	500 MHz·km @ 850 nm
MMF OM3 50/125 µm	2003	1500 MHz·km @ 850 nm
MMF OM4 50/125 µm	2008	3500 MHz·km @ 850 nm
MMF OM5 50/125 µm	2016	3500 MHz·km @ 850 nm and 1850 MHz·km @ 950 nm
SMF OS1 9/125 µm	1998	1.0 dB/km @ 1300/1550 nm
SMF OS2 9/125 µm	2000	0.4 dB/km @ 1300/1550 nm

Name	Standard	Status	Media	Connector	Transceiver module	Reach (m)	# Media (⇆)	# Lambdas (→)	# Lanes (→)	Notes
40 Gigabit Ethernet (40 GbE) - (Data rate: 40 Gbit/s - Line code: 64b/66b × NRZ - Line rate: 4x 10.3125 GBd = 41.25 GBd - Full-Duplex)
40GBASE-KR4	802.3ba-2010 (CL82/84)	phase- out	Cu-Backplane	—N/a	—N/a	1	8	N/A	4	PCBs; possible breakout / lane separation to 4x 10G through splitter cable (QSFP+ to 4x SFP+); involves CL73 for auto-negotiation, and CL72 for link training.
40GBASE-CR4; Direct Attach	802.3ba-2010 (CL82/85)	phase- out	twinaxial balanced	QSFP+ (SFF-8635)	QSFP+	10	8	N/A	4	Data centers (inter-rack) possible breakout / lane separation to 4x 10G through splitter cable (QSFP+ to 4x SFP+); involves CL73 for auto-negotiation and CL72 for link training.
40GBASE-SR4	802.3ba-2010 (CL82/86)	phase- out	Fibre; 850 nm	MPO/MTP (MPO-12)	CFP; QSFP+	OM3: 100	8	1	4	possible breakout / lane separation to 4x 10G through splitter cable (MPO/MTP to 4x LC-pairs).
40GBASE-SR4	802.3ba-2010 (CL82/86)	phase- out	Fibre; 850 nm	MPO/MTP (MPO-12)	CFP; QSFP+	OM4: 150	8	1	4	possible breakout / lane separation to 4x 10G through splitter cable (MPO/MTP to 4x LC-pairs).
40GBASE-eSR4	proprietary (non IEEE)	phase- out	Fibre; 850 nm	MPO/MTP (MPO-12)	QSFP+	OM3: 300	8	1	4	possible breakout / lane separation to 4x 10G through splitter cable (MPO/MTP to 4x LC-pairs).
40GBASE-eSR4	proprietary (non IEEE)	phase- out	Fibre; 850 nm	MPO/MTP (MPO-12)	QSFP+	OM4: 400	8	1	4	possible breakout / lane separation to 4x 10G through splitter cable (MPO/MTP to 4x LC-pairs).
40GBASE-SRBD (BiDirectional)	proprietary (non IEEE)	phase- out	Fibre; 850 nm 900 nm	LC	QSFP+	OM3: 100	2	2	2	WDM duplex fiber each used to transmit and receive on two wavelengths. The major selling point of this variant is its ability to run over existing 10G multi-mode fiber (i.e. allowing easy migration from 10G to 40G).
40GBASE-SRBD (BiDirectional)	proprietary (non IEEE)	phase- out	Fibre; 850 nm 900 nm	LC	QSFP+	OM4: 150	2	2	2	WDM duplex fiber each used to transmit and receive on two wavelengths. The major selling point of this variant is its ability to run over existing 10G multi-mode fiber (i.e. allowing easy migration from 10G to 40G).
40GBASE-SWDM4	proprietary (MSA, Nov 2017)	phase- out	Fibre; 844-858 nm 874-888 nm 904-918 nm 934-948 nm	LC	QSFP+	OM3: 240	2	4	4	SWDM
40GBASE-SWDM4	proprietary (MSA, Nov 2017)	phase- out	Fibre; 844-858 nm 874-888 nm 904-918 nm 934-948 nm	LC	QSFP+	OM4: 350	2	4	4	SWDM
40GBASE-SWDM4	proprietary (MSA, Nov 2017)	phase- out	Fibre; 844-858 nm 874-888 nm 904-918 nm 934-948 nm	LC	QSFP+	OM5: 440	2	4	4	SWDM
40GBASE-LR4	802.3ba-2010 (CL82/87)	phase- out	Fibre; 1271 nm 1291 nm 1311 nm 1331 nm ±6.5 nm each	LC	CFP; QSFP+	OSx: 10k	2	4	4	WDM
40GBASE-ER4	802.3bm-2015 (CL82/87)	phase- out	Fibre; 1271 nm 1291 nm 1311 nm 1331 nm ±6.5 nm each	LC	QSFP+	OSx: 40k	2	4	4	WDM
40GBASE-LX4 / -LM4	proprietary (non IEEE)	phase- out	Fibre; 1271 nm 1291 nm 1311 nm 1331 nm ±6.5 nm each	LC	QSFP+	OM3: 140	2	4	4	WDM as primarily designed for single mode (-LR4), this mode of operation is out of specification for some transceivers.
40GBASE-LX4 / -LM4	proprietary (non IEEE)	phase- out	Fibre; 1271 nm 1291 nm 1311 nm 1331 nm ±6.5 nm each	LC	QSFP+	OM4: 160	2	4	4	WDM as primarily designed for single mode (-LR4), this mode of operation is out of specification for some transceivers.
40GBASE-LX4 / -LM4	proprietary (non IEEE)	phase- out	Fibre; 1271 nm 1291 nm 1311 nm 1331 nm ±6.5 nm each	LC	QSFP+	OSx: 10k	2	4	4	WDM as primarily designed for single mode (-LR4), this mode of operation is out of specification for some transceivers.
40GBASE-PLR4 (parallel -LR4)	proprietary (non IEEE)	phase- out	Fibre; 1310 nm	MPO/MTP (MPO-12)	QSFP+	OSx: 10k	8	1	4	possible breakout / lane separation to 4x 10G through splitter cable (MPO/MTP to 4x LC-pairs).
40GBASE-FR	802.3bg-2011 (CL82/89)	phase- out	Fibre; 1550 nm	LC	CFP	OSx: 2k	2	1	1	Line rate: 41.25 GBd capability to receive 1310 nm light besides 1550 nm; allows inter-operation with a longer reach 1310 nm PHY (TBD); use of 1550 nm implies compatibility with existing test equipment and infrastructure.

Additional note for 40GBASE-CR4/-KR4:

CL73 allows communication between the 2 PHYs to exchange technical capability pages, and both PHYs come to a common speed and media type. Completion of CL73 initiates CL72. CL72 allows each of the 4 lanes' transmitters to adjust pre-emphasis via feedback from the link partner.

40GBASE-T
40GBASE-T is a port type for 4-pair balanced twisted-pair Cat.8 copper cabling up to 30 m defined in IEEE 802.3bq. IEEE 802.3bq-2016 standard was approved by the IEEE-SA Standards Board on June 30, 2016. It uses 16-level PAM signaling over four lanes at 3,200 MBd each, scaled up from 10GBASE-T.

Comparison of twisted-pair-based Ethernet physical transport layers (TP-PHYs)
Name	Standard	Status	Speed (Mbit/s)	Pairs required	Lanes per direction	Bits per hertz	Line code	Symbol rate per lane (MBd)	Bandwidth	Max distance (m)	Cable	Cable rating (MHz)	Usage
40GBASE-T	802.3bq-2016 (CL113)	current	40000	4	4	6.25	PAM-16 RS-FEC (192, 186) LDPC	3200	1600	30	Cat 8	2000	LAN, Data centers

== Chip-to-chip/chip-to-module interfaces ==
CAUI-10
CAUI-10 is a 100 Gbit/s 10-lane electrical interface defined in 802.3ba.

CAUI-4
CAUI-4 is a 100 Gbit/s 4-lane electrical interface defined in 802.3bm Annex 83E with a nominal signaling rate for each lane of 25.78125 GBd using NRZ modulation.

100GAUI-4
100GAUI-4 is a 100 Gbit/s 4-lane electrical interface defined in 802.3cd Annex 135D/E with a nominal signaling rate for each lane of 26.5625 GBd using NRZ modulation and RS-FEC(544,514) so suitable for use with 100GBASE-CR2, 100GBASE-KR2, 100GBASE-SR2, 100GBASE-DR, 100GBASE-FR1, 100GBASE-LR1 PHYs.

100GAUI-2
100GAUI-2 is a 100 Gbit/s 2-lane electrical interface defined in 802.3cd Annex 135F/G with a nominal signaling rate for each lane of 26.5625 GBd using PAM4 modulation and RS-FEC(544,514) so suitable for use with 100GBASE-CR2, 100GBASE-KR2, 100GBASE-SR2, 100GBASE-DR, 100GBASE-FR1, 100GBASE-LR1 PHYs.

100GAUI-1
100GAUI-1 is a 100 Gbit/s 1-lane electrical interface defined in 802.3ck Annex 120F/G with a nominal signaling rate for each lane of 53.125 GBd using PAM4 modulation and RS-FEC(544,514) so suitable for use with 100GBASE-CR1, 100GBASE-KR1, 100GBASE-SR1, 100GBASE-DR, 100GBASE-FR1, 100GBASE-LR1 PHYs.

== Optical connectors ==
Short reach interfaces use Multiple-Fiber Push-On/Pull-off (MPO) optical connectors. 40GBASE-SR4 and 100GBASE-SR4 use MPO-12 while 100GBASE-SR10 uses MPO-24 with one optical lane per fiber strand.

Long reach interfaces use duplex LC connectors with all optical lanes multiplexed with WDM.

== History ==
=== Standards development ===
On July 18, 2006, a call for interest for a High Speed Study Group (HSSG) to investigate new standards for high-speed Ethernet was held at the IEEE 802.3 plenary meeting in San Diego.

The first 802.3 HSSG study group meeting was held in September 2006. In June 2007, a trade group called "Road to 100G" was formed after the NXTcomm trade show in Chicago.

On December 5, 2007, the Project Authorization Request (PAR) for the P802.3ba 40 Gbit/s and 100 Gbit/s Ethernet Task Force was approved with the following project scope:

The purpose of this project is to extend the 802.3 protocol to operating speeds of 40 Gbit/s and 100 Gbit/s in order to provide a significant increase in bandwidth while maintaining maximum compatibility with the installed base of 802.3 interfaces, previous investment in research and development, and principles of network operation and management. The project is to provide for the interconnection of equipment satisfying the distance requirements of the intended applications.

The 802.3ba task force met for the first time in January 2008. This standard was approved at the June 2010 IEEE Standards Board meeting under the name IEEE Std 802.3ba-2010.

The first 40 Gbit/s Ethernet Single-mode Fibre PMD study group meeting was held in January 2010 and on March 25, 2010, the P802.3bg Single-mode Fibre PMD Task Force was approved for the 40 Gbit/s serial SMF PMD.

The scope of this project is to add a single-mode fiber Physical Medium Dependent (PMD) option for serial 40 Gbit/s operation by specifying additions to, and appropriate modifications of, IEEE Std 802.3-2008 as amended by the IEEE P802.3ba project (and any other approved amendment or corrigendum).

On June 17, 2010, the IEEE 802.3ba standard was approved. In March 2011, the IEEE 802.3bg standard was approved. On September 10, 2011, the P802.3bj 100 Gbit/s Backplane and Copper Cable task force was approved.

The scope of this project is to specify additions to and appropriate modifications of IEEE Std 802.3 to add 100 Gbit/s 4-lane Physical Layer (PHY) specifications and management parameters for operation on backplanes and twinaxial copper cables, and specify optional Energy Efficient Ethernet (EEE) for 40 Gbit/s and 100 Gbit/s operation over backplanes and copper cables.

On May 10, 2013, the P802.3bm 40 Gbit/s and 100 Gbit/s Fiber Optic Task Force was approved.

This project is to specify additions to and appropriate modifications of IEEE Std 802.3 to add 100 Gbit/s Physical Layer (PHY) specifications and management parameters, using a four-lane electrical interface for operation on multimode and single-mode fiber optic cables, and to specify optional Energy Efficient Ethernet (EEE) for 40 Gbit/s and 100 Gbit/s operation over fiber optic cables. In addition, to add 40 Gbit/s Physical Layer (PHY) specifications and management parameters for operation on extended reach (>10 km) single-mode fiber optic cables.

Also on May 10, 2013, the P802.3bq 40GBASE-T Task Force was approved.

Specify a Physical Layer (PHY) for operation at 40 Gbit/s on balanced twisted-pair copper cabling, using existing Media Access Control, and with extensions to the appropriate physical layer management parameters.

On June 12, 2014, the IEEE 802.3bj standard was approved.

On February 16, 2015, the IEEE 802.3bm standard was approved.

On May 12, 2016, the IEEE P802.3cd Task Force started working to define next generation two-lane 100 Gbit/s PHY.

On May 14, 2018, the PAR for the IEEE P802.3ck Task Force was approved. The scope of this project is to specify additions to and appropriate modifications of IEEE Std 802.3 to add Physical Layer specifications and Management Parameters for 100 Gbit/s, 200 Gbit/s, and 400 Gbit/s electrical interfaces based on 100 Gbit/s signaling.

On December 5, 2018, the IEEE-SA Board approved the IEEE 802.3cd standard.

On November 12, 2018, the IEEE P802.3ct Task Force started working to define PHY supporting 100 Gbit/s operation on a single wavelength capable of at least 80 km over a DWDM system (using a combination of phase and amplitude modulation with coherent detection).

In May 2019, the IEEE P802.3cu Task Force started working to define single-wavelength 100 Gbit/s PHYs for operation over SMF (Single-Mode Fiber) with lengths up to at least 2 km (100GBASE-FR1) and 10 km (100GBASE-LR1).

In June 2020, the IEEE P802.3db Task Force started working to define a physical layer specification that supports 100 Gbit/s operation over 1 pair of MMF with lengths up to at least 50 m.

On February 11, 2021, the IEEE-SA Board approved the IEEE 802.3cu standard.

On June 16, 2021, the IEEE-SA Board approved the IEEE 802.3ct standard.

On September 21, 2022, the IEEE-SA Board approved the IEEE 802.3ck and 802.3db standards.

=== Early products ===
Optical signal transmission over a nonlinear medium is principally an analog design problem. As such, it has evolved more slowly than digital circuit lithography (which generally progressed in step with Moore's law). This explains why 10 Gbit/s transport systems existed since the mid-1990s, while the first forays into 100 Gbit/s transmission happened about 15 years later – a 10x speed increase over 15 years is far slower than the 2x speed per 1.5 years typically cited for Moore's law.

Nevertheless, at least five firms (Ciena, Alcatel-Lucent, MRV, ADVA Optical and Huawei) made customer announcements for 100 Gbit/s transport systems by August 2011, with varying degrees of capabilities. Although vendors claimed that 100 Gbit/s light paths could use existing analog optical infrastructure, deployment of high-speed technology was tightly controlled and extensive interoperability tests were required before moving them into service.

Designing routers or switches that support 100 Gbit/s interfaces is difficult. The need to process a 100 Gbit/s stream of packets at line rate without reordering within IP/MPLS microflows is one reason for this.

As of 2011, most components in the 100 Gbit/s packet processing path (PHY chips, NPUs, memories) were not readily available off-the-shelf or require extensive qualification and co-design. Another problem is related to the low-output production of 100 Gbit/s optical components, which were also not easily available – especially in pluggable, long-reach or tunable laser flavors.

==== Backplane ====
NetLogic Microsystems announced backplane modules in October 2010.

==== Multimode fiber ====
In 2009, Mellanox and Reflex Photonics announced modules based on the CFP agreement.

==== Single mode fiber ====
Finisar, Sumitomo Electric Industries, and OpNext all demonstrated singlemode 40 or 100 Gbit/s Ethernet modules based on the C form-factor pluggable (CFP) agreement at the European Conference and Exhibition on Optical Communication in 2009. The first lasers for 100 GBE were demonstrated in 2008.

==== Compatibility ====
Optical fiber IEEE 802.3ba implementations were not compatible with the numerous 40 and 100 Gbit/s line rate transport systems because they had different optical layer and modulation formats, as the IEEE 802.3ba interface types show. In particular, existing 40 Gbit/s transport solutions that used dense wavelength-division multiplexing to pack four 10 Gbit/s signals into one optical medium were not compatible with the IEEE 802.3ba standard, which used either coarse WDM in 1310 nm wavelength region with four 25 Gbit/s or ten 10 Gbit/s channels, or parallel optics with four or ten optical fibers per direction.

==== Test and measurement ====
- Quellan announced a test board in 2009.
- Ixia developed Physical Coding Sublayer Lanes and demonstrated a working 100GbE link through a test setup at NXTcomm in June 2008. Ixia announced test equipment in November 2008.
- Discovery Semiconductors introduced optoelectronics converters for 100 Gbit/s testing of the 10 km and 40 km Ethernet standards in February 2009.
- JDS Uniphase (now VIAVI Solutions) introduced test and measurement products for 40 and 100 Gbit/s Ethernet in August 2009.
- Spirent Communications introduced test and measurement products in September 2009.
- EXFO demonstrated interoperability in January 2010.
- Xena Networks demonstrated test equipment at the Technical University of Denmark in January 2011.
- Calnex Solutions introduced 100GbE Synchronous Ethernet synchronisation test equipment in November 2014.
- Spirent Communications introduced the Attero-100G for 100GbE and 40GbE impairment emulation in April 2015.
- VeEX introduced its CFP-based UX400-100GE and 40GE test and measurement platform in 2012, followed by CFP2, CFP4, QSFP28 and QSFP+ versions in 2015.

==== Mellanox Technologies ====
Mellanox Technologies introduced the ConnectX-4 100GbE single and dual port adapter in November 2014. In the same period, Mellanox introduced availability of 100GbE copper and fiber cables. In June 2015, Mellanox introduced the Spectrum 10, 25, 40, 50 and 100GbE switch models.

==== Aitia ====
Aitia International introduced the C-GEP FPGA-based switching platform in February 2013. Aitia also produces 100G/40G Ethernet PCS/PMA+MAC IP cores for FPGA developers and academic researchers.

==== Arista ====
Arista Networks introduced the 7500E switch (with up to 96 100GbE ports) in April 2013. In July 2014, Arista introduced the 7280E switch (the world's first top-of-rack switch with 100G uplink ports).

==== Extreme Networks ====
Extreme Networks introduced a four-port 100GbE module for the BlackDiamond X8 core switch in November 2012.

==== Dell ====
Dell's Force10 switches support 40 Gbit/s interfaces. These 40 Gbit/s fiber-optical interfaces using QSFP+ transceivers can be found on the Z9000 distributed core switches, S4810 and S4820 as well as the blade-switches MXL and the IO-Aggregator. The Dell PowerConnect 8100 series switches also offer 40 Gbit/s QSFP+ interfaces.

==== Chelsio ====
Chelsio Communications introduced 40 Gbit/s Ethernet network adapters (based on the fifth generation of its Terminator architecture) in June 2013.

==== Telesoft Technologies Ltd ====
Telesoft Technologies announced the dual 100G PCIe accelerator card, part of the MPAC-IP series. Telesoft also announced the STR 400G (Segmented Traffic Router) and the 100G MCE (Media Converter and Extension).

=== Commercial trials and deployments ===
Unlike the "race to 10 Gbit/s" that was driven by the imminent need to address growth pains of the Internet in the late 1990s, customer interest in 100 Gbit/s technologies was mostly driven by economic factors. The common reasons to adopt the higher speeds were:

- to reduce the number of optical wavelengths ("lambdas") used and the need to light new fiber
- to utilize bandwidth more efficiently than 10 Gbit/s link aggregate groups
- to provide cheaper wholesale, internet peering and data center connectivity
- to skip the relatively expensive 40 Gbit/s technology and move directly from 10 to 100 Gbit/s

==== Alcatel-Lucent ====
In November 2007, Alcatel-Lucent held the first field trial of 100 Gbit/s optical transmission. Completed over a live, in-service 504-kilometre portion of the Verizon network, it connected the Florida cities of Tampa and Miami.

100GbE interfaces for the 7450 ESS/7750 SR service routing platform were first announced in June 2009, with field trials with Verizon, T-Systems and Portugal Telecom taking place in June–September 2010. In September 2009, Alcatel-Lucent combined the 100G capabilities of its IP routing and optical transport portfolio in an integrated solution called Converged Backbone Transformation.

In June 2011, Alcatel-Lucent introduced a packet processing architecture known as FP3, advertised for 400 Gbit/s rates. Alcatel-Lucent announced the XRS 7950 core router (based on the FP3) in May 2012.

==== Brocade ====
Brocade Communications Systems introduced their first 100GbE products (based on the former Foundry Networks MLXe hardware) in September 2010. In June 2011, the new product went live at the AMS-IX traffic exchange point in Amsterdam.

==== Cisco ====
Cisco Systems and Comcast announced their 100GbE trials in June 2008. However, it is doubtful that this transmission could approach 100 Gbit/s speeds when using a 40 Gbit/s per slot CRS-1 platform for packet processing. Cisco's first deployment of 100GbE at AT&T and Comcast took place in April 2011. In the same year, Cisco tested the 100GbE interface between CRS-3 and a new generation of their ASR9K edge router model. In 2017, Cisco announced a 32 port 100GbE Cisco Catalyst 9500 Series switch and in 2019 the modular Catalyst 9600 Series switch with a 100GbE line card

==== Huawei ====
In October 2008, Huawei presented their first 100GbE interface for their NE5000e router. In September 2009, Huawei also demonstrated an end-to-end 100 Gbit/s link. It was mentioned that Huawei's products had the self-developed NPU "Solar 2.0 PFE2A" onboard and was using pluggable optics in CFP.

In a mid-2010 product brief, the NE5000e line cards were given the commercial name LPUF-100 and credited with using two Solar-2.0 NPUs per 100GbE port in opposite (ingress/egress) configuration. Nevertheless, in October 2010, the company referenced shipments of NE5000e to Russian cell operator "Megafon" as "40 GBPS/slot" solution, with "scalability up to" 100 Gbit/s.

In April 2011, Huawei announced that the NE5000e was updated to carry 2x100GbE interfaces per slot using LPU-200 linecards. In a related solution brief, Huawei reported 120 thousand Solar 1.0 integrated circuits shipped to customers, but no Solar 2.0 numbers were given. Following the August 2011 trial in Russia, Huawei reported paying 100 Gbit/s DWDM customers, but no 100GbE shipments on NE5000e.

==== Juniper ====
Juniper Networks announced 100GbE for its T-series routers in June 2009. The 1x100GbE option followed in Nov 2010, when a joint press release with academic backbone network Internet2 marked the first production 100GbE interfaces going live in real network.

In the same year, Juniper demonstrated 100GbE operation between core (T-series) and edge (MX 3D) routers. Juniper, in March 2011, announced first shipments of 100GbE interfaces to a major North American service provider (Verizon).

In April 2011, Juniper deployed a 100GbE system on the UK education network JANET. In July 2011, Juniper announced 100GbE with Australian ISP iiNet on their T1600 routing platform. Juniper started shipping the MPC3E line card for the MX router, a 100GbE CFP MIC, and a 100GbE LR4 CFP optics in March 2012. In Spring 2013, Juniper Networks announced the availability of the MPC4E line card for the MX router that includes 2 100GbE CFP slots and 8 10GbE SFP+ interfaces.

In June 2015, Juniper Networks announced the availability of its CFP-100GBASE-ZR module, which is a plug-and-play solution that brings 80 km 100GbE to MX and PTX based networks. The CFP-100GBASE-ZR module uses DP-QPSK modulation and coherent receiver technology with an optimized DSP and FEC implementation. The low-power module can be directly retrofitted into existing CFP sockets on MX and PTX routers.

== See also ==
- Ethernet Alliance
- InfiniBand
- Interconnect bottleneck
- Optical communication
- Fiber-optic cable
- Optical transport network
- Parallel optical interface
- Terabit Ethernet
