= CXP (connector) =

Electrical connector used for Infiniband and Ethernet

In computer networking, CXP is a copper connector system specified by the InfiniBand Trade Association. It provides twelve 10 Gbit/s links suitable for single 100 Gigabit Ethernet, three 40 Gigabit Ethernet channels, or twelve 10 Gigabit Ethernet channels or a single Infiniband 12× QDR link. The C is the HEX digit of Twelve.

The connector has 4 rows, each of 21 pin, total 84 pins

== See also ==
- C form-factor pluggable
- QSFP
- Small Form-factor Pluggable
