= HIPPI =

Computer bus

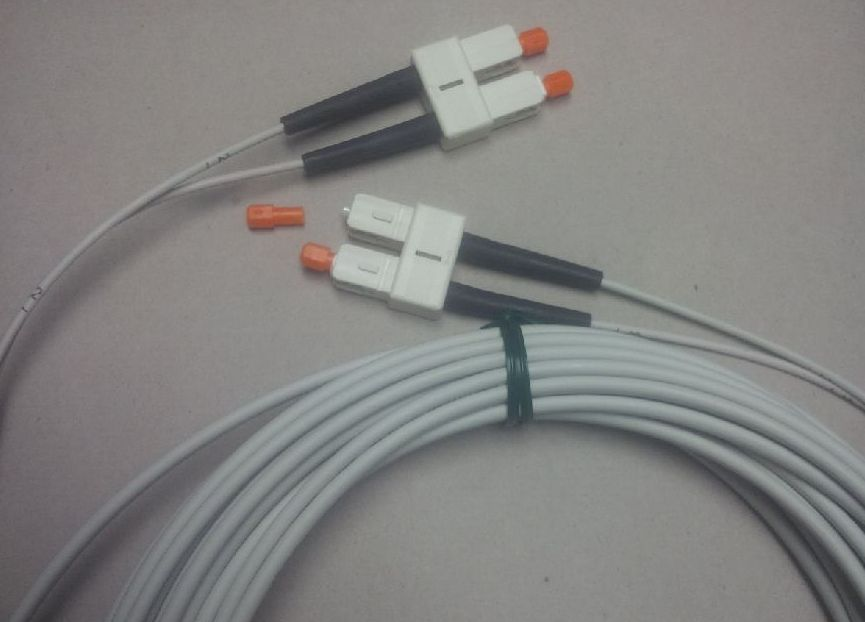
Serial HIPPI fibre optic cable

HIPPI, short for High Performance Parallel Interface, is a computer bus for the attachment of high speed storage devices to supercomputers, in a point-to-point link. It was popular in the late 1980s and into the mid-to-late 1990s, but has since been replaced by ever-faster standard interfaces like Fibre Channel and 10 Gigabit Ethernet.

HIPPI was the first “near-gigabit” (0.8 Gbit/s) (ANSI) standard for network data transmission. It was specifically designed for supercomputers and was never intended for mass market networks such as Ethernet. Many of the features developed for HIPPI were integrated into such technologies as InfiniBand. What is remarkable about HIPPI is that it came out when Ethernet was still a 10 Mbit/s data link and SONET at OC-3 (155 Mbit/s) was considered leading edge technology.

The first HIPPI standard (HIPPI-PH) defined a 50-pair (100-wire) unidirectional twisted pair cable, running at 800 Mbit/s (100 MB/s) with maximum range limited to 25 metres (82 ft). A bidirectional connection therefore required two separate cables. 32 bits are transferred in parallel with a 25 MHz clock. Later standards included a 1600 Mbit/s (200 MB/s) mode (using two cables running at the same 25 MHz clock in parallel) as well as Serial HIPPI using fibre optics with a maximum range of 10 kilometres (6.2 mi).

HIPPI usage dwindled in the late 1990s. This was partly because Ultra3 SCSI offered rates of 320 MB/s and was available at almost any computer store at commodity prices. Meanwhile, Fibre Channel offered simple interconnect with both HIPPI and SCSI (it can run both protocols) and speeds of up to 400 MB/s on fibre and 100 MB/s on a single pair of twisted pair copper wires. Both of these systems have since been supplanted by even higher performance systems during the 2000s.

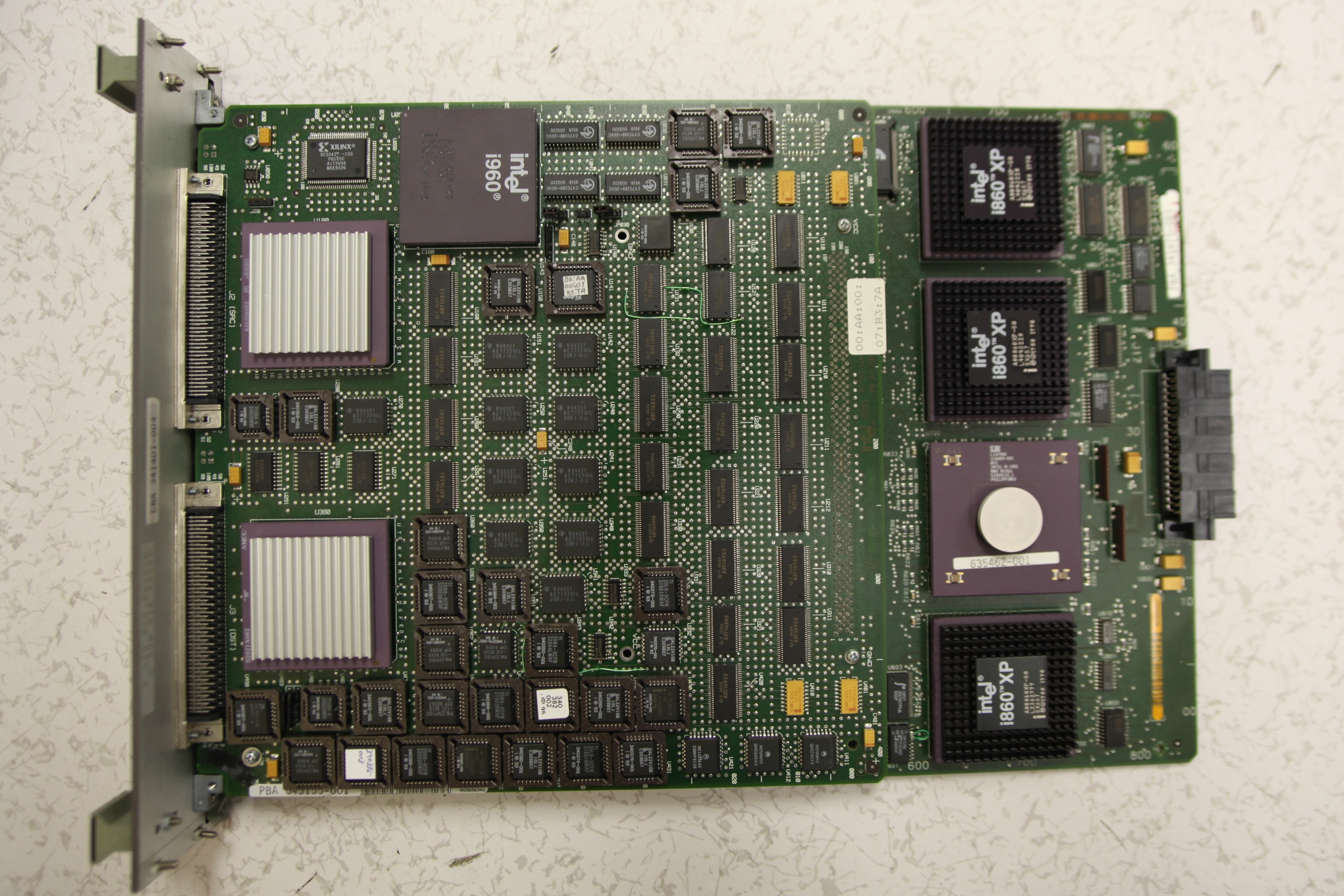
Intel Paragon I/O node with HIPPI interface

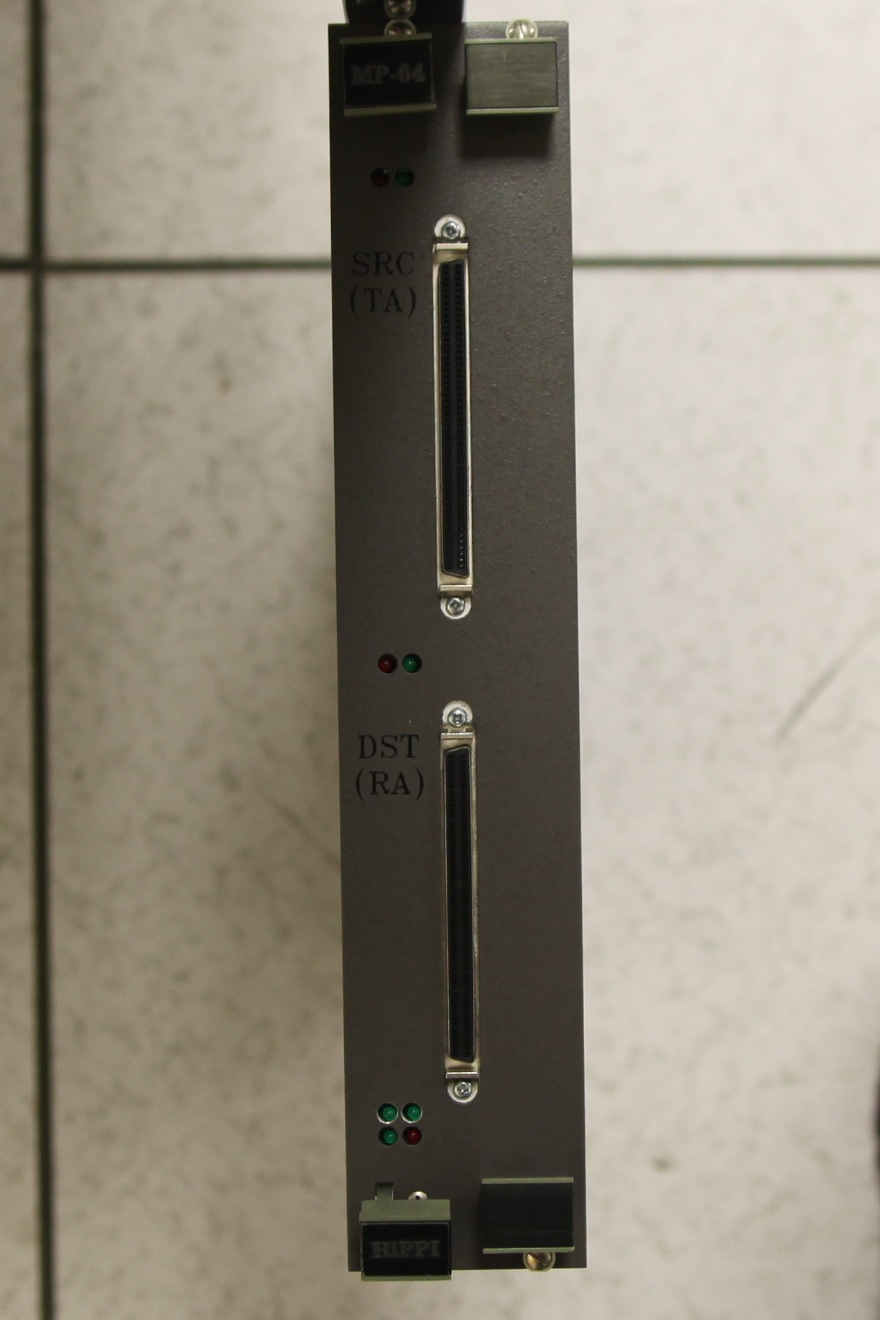
Parallel HPPI interface connections

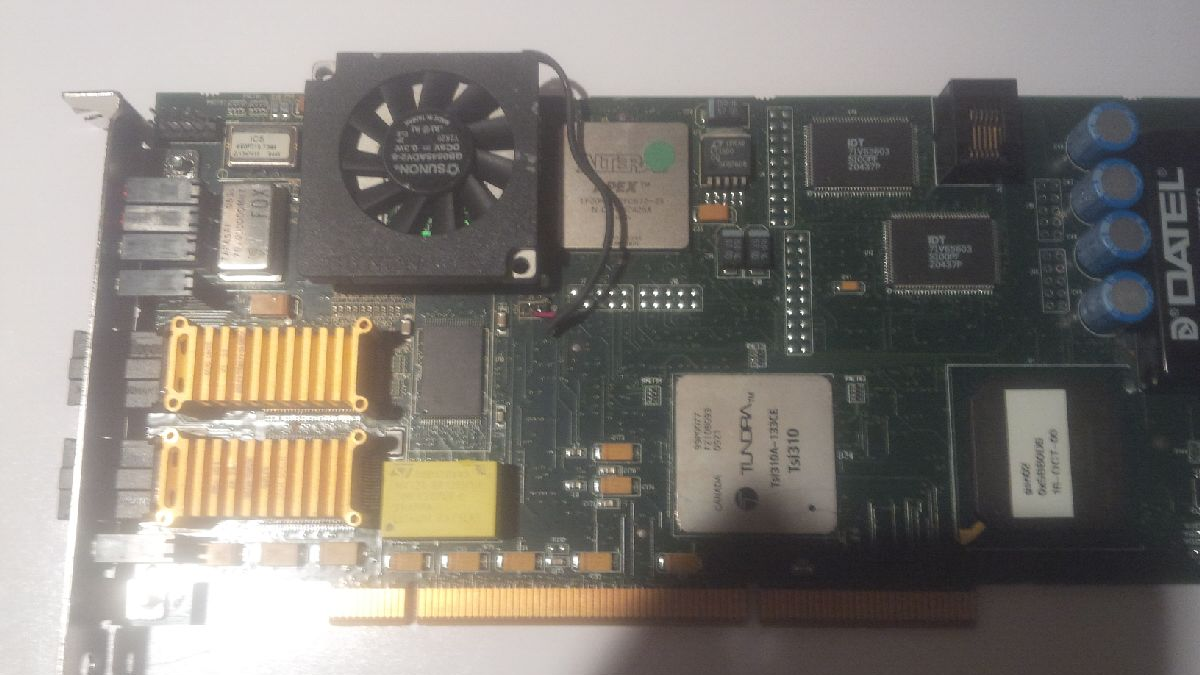
GSN - HIPPI-6400 card

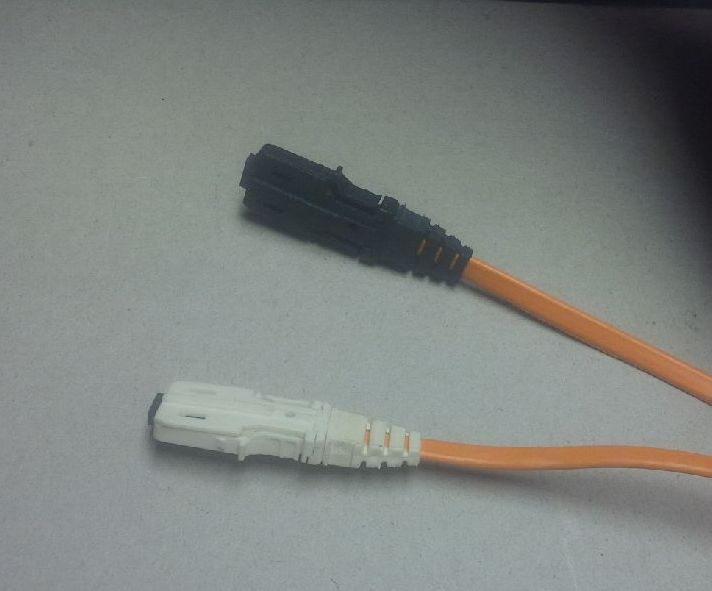
Serial GSN HIPPI-6400 fibre optic cable

== GSN - HIPPI-6400 ==
From 1996 on an effort to improve the speed resulted in HIPPI-6400, which was later renamed to GSN (for Gigabyte System Network), but GSN saw little use due to competing standards and high cost. GSN has a full-duplex bandwidth of 6400 Mbit/s or 800 MB/s in each direction. GSN was developed by Silicon Graphics and Los Alamos National Laboratory. It uses a parallel interface for higher speeds.

GSN copper cables (HIPPI-6400-PH) are limited to 40 metres (130 ft). Like HiPPI-800, GSN uses two separate simplex channels (one in each direction). Unlike HiPPI-800, they are combined in a single cable and connector. Each channel consists of 16 data lines, four control lines, one framing line and two clock lines, for a total of 23 lines, all of which are differential. The connectors (Berg Micropax 100) have 100 pins total, of which 92 (23×2×2) are used.

Fiber-optic cables (HIPPI-6400-OPT) are limited to 1 km. It uses the same principal signals as the copper interface, but runs everything at twice the clock rate, which halves the number of data and control fibers. Each channel thus consists of 8 data fibers, two control fibers and one clock and framing fiber each. All 12 fibers of a channel are bundled in a single multi-fiber connector and cable. A full-duplex connection thus consists of two separate cables.

== See also ==
- GG45
- List of device bandwidths
- Optical communication
- Optical fiber cable
- Parallel optical interface
- TERA
- XAUI
