= EtherCON =

Ruggedized Ethernet connector

The EtherCON is a ruggedized lockable Ethernet connector designed for twisted pair wiring. It is manufactured by Neutrik, it is intended to use in professional audio and stage lighting network applications.

== Design ==
The EtherCON design is modeled after the XLR connector featuring a circular hard metal shell and a locking latch. The cable connector is always male and is designed to fit over a standard 8P8C modular connector. The chassis connector is always female and uses the standard XLR panel connector form factor. It can be mated with either an EtherCON connector or a standard 8P8C plug. Chassis connectors are available with Cat 5e, Cat 6 or 6A compatibility, with the Cat 5e and 6A models being cross-compatible. (The Cat 6 model utilizes a different shell design from the other models.) Neutrik makes two styles of the connector, one for assembly before the 8P8C plug is attached, and one that will fit over a pre-attached plug.

When used with special headers, EtherCON can achieve IP65-rated waterproofing, making it suitable for outdoor use.

== Applications ==
EtherCON connectors are used on many audio over Ethernet and audio over IP products. EtherCON connectors are used on various lighting fixtures as a method of sending and receiving DMX512 data signal. EtherCON connectors are also used to transfer data across large LED displays in both indoor and outdoor settings.
