= Cat7 =

Cat 7 or CAT7 may refer to:

- Category 7 cable, a cable standard
- Lasqueti Island/False Bay Water Aerodrome (ICAO airport code: CAT7)
- LTE User Equipment Category 7, in E-UTRA
