= PLCA =

PLCA may refer to:

- Primary cutaneous amyloidosis, a form of amyloidosis associated with the oncostatin M receptor.
- PHY-Level Collision Avoidance, a reconciliation sublayer for IEEE 802.3 (Ethernet)
