= Modular connector =

Electrical connector commonly used in telephone and computer networks

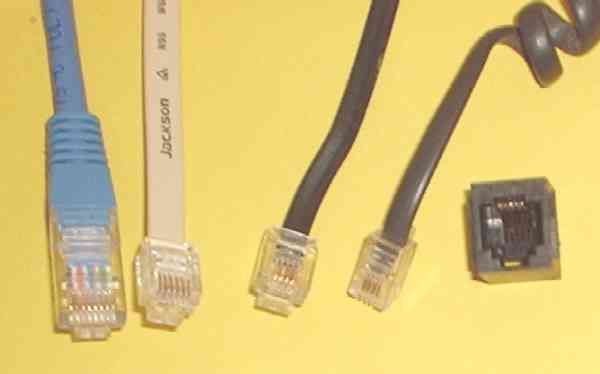
Left to right, modular connectors: 8P8C plug, 6P6C plug, 6P4C plug, 4P4C plug, 6P6C jack.

A modular connector is a type of electrical connector for cords and cables of electronic devices and appliances, such as in computer networking, telecommunication equipment, and audio headsets.

Modular connectors were originally developed for use on specific Bell System telephone sets in the 1960s, and similar types found use for simple interconnection of customer-provided telephone subscriber premises equipment to the telephone network. The Federal Communications Commission (FCC) mandated in 1976 an interface registration system, in which they became known as registered jacks. The convenience of prior existence for designers and ease of use led to a proliferation of modular connectors for many other applications. Many applications that originally used bulkier, more expensive connectors have converted to modular connectors. Probably the best-known applications of modular connectors are for telephone and Ethernet.

Accordingly, various electronic interface specifications exist for applications using modular connectors, which prescribe physical characteristics and assign electrical signals to their contacts.

== Nomenclature ==
Modular connectors are often referred to as modular phone jack and plug, RJ connector, and Western jack and plug. The term modular connector arose from its original use in modular wiring components of telephone equipment by the Western Electric Company in the 1960s. This includes the 6P2C used for telephone line connections and 4P4C used for handset connectors.

Registered jack designations describe the signals and wiring used for voice and data communication at customer-facing interfaces of the public switched telephone network (PSTN). It is common to use a registered jack number to refer to the physical connector itself; for instance, the regular 8P8C modular connector type is often labeled RJ45 because the registered jack standard of the similar name RJ45S specified a similar, but modified, 8P8C modular connector. Similarly, various six-position modular connectors may be called RJ11. Likewise, the 4P4C connector is sometimes called RJ9 or RJ22 though no such official designations exist.

== History ==
The first types of small modular telephone connectors were created by AT&T in the mid-1960s for the plug-in handset and line cords of the Trimline telephone. Driven by demand for multiple sets in residences with various lengths of cords, the Bell System introduced customer-connectable part kits and telephones, sold through PhoneCenter stores in the early 1970s. For this purpose, Illinois Bell started installing modular telephone sets on a limited scale in June 1972. The patents by Edwin C. Hardesty and coworkers, US 3699498 (1972) and US 3860316 (1975), followed by other improvements, were the basis for the modular molded-plastic connectors that became commonplace for telephone cords by the 1980s. In 1976, these connectors were standardized nationally in the United States by the Registration Interface program of the Federal Communications Commission (FCC), which designated a series of Registered Jack (RJ) specifications for interconnection of customer-premises equipment to the PSTN.

== Gender ==
Modular connectors have gender: plugs are considered to be male, while jacks or sockets are considered to be female. Plugs are used to terminate cables and cords, while jacks are used for fixed locations on surfaces of walls, panels, and equipment. Other than telephone extension cables, cables with a modular plug on one end and a jack on the other are rare. Instead, cables are usually connected using a female-to-female coupler, having two jacks wired back-to-back.

== Latching tab and orientation ==
Most modular connectors are designed with a latching mechanism that secures the physical connection. As a plug is inserted into a jack, a plastic tab on the plug locks against a ridge in the socket so that the plug cannot be removed without disengaging the tab by pressing it against the plug body. The standard orientation for installing a jack in a vertical surface is with the tab down.

The modular plug is often installed with a boot, a plastic covering over the tab and body, to prevent the latching tab from hooking into other cords or edges, which may cause excessive bending or breaking of the tab. Such snagless cords are usually constructed by installing the protective boot before the modular plug is crimped.

== Size and contacts ==
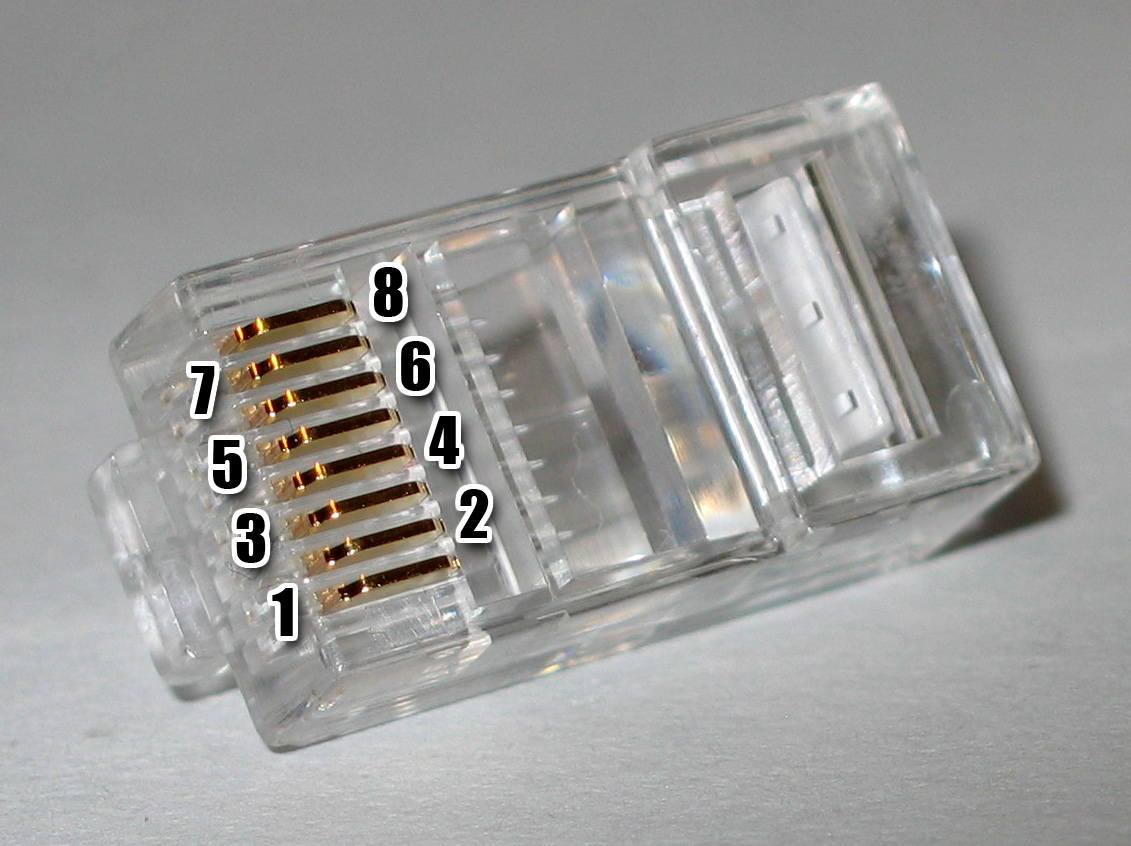
8P8C modular plug contact numbering. This is the common crimp-type plug.

Modular connectors are designated using two numbers that represent the maximum number of contact positions and the number of installed contacts, with each number followed by P and C, respectively. For example, 6P2C is a connector having six positions and two installed contacts. Alternate designations omit the letters while separating the position and contact quantities with either an x (6x2) or a slash (6/2).

When not installed, contacts are usually omitted from the outer positions inward, such that the number of contacts is almost always even. The connector body positions with omitted or unconnected contacts are unused for the electrical connection but ensure that the plug fits correctly. For instance, inexpensive telephone cords often have connectors with six positions and four contacts, to which are attached just two wires, carrying only line 1 from a one-, two-, or three-line jack.

The contact positions are numbered sequentially, starting from 1. When viewed head-on with the retention mechanism on the bottom, jacks will have contact position number 1 on the left and plugs will have it on the right. Contacts are numbered by the contact position. For example, on a six-position, two-contact plug, where the outermost four positions do not have contacts, the two contacts are numbered 3 and 4.

Modular connectors are manufactured in four sizes, with four, six, eight, and ten positions. The insulating plastic bodies of 4P and 6P connectors have different widths, whereas 8P or 10P connectors share an even larger body width.

=== Insulation displacement contact types ===
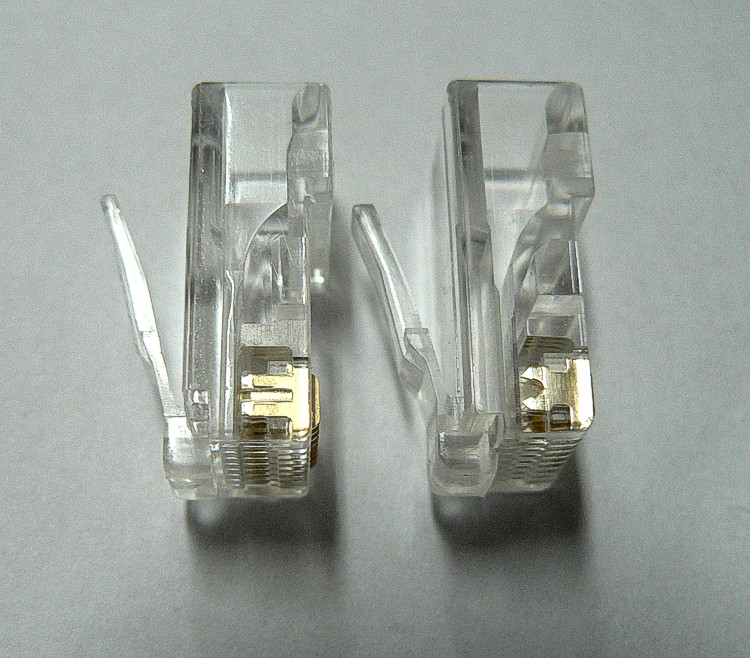
8P8C plug with contacts for solid wire (left) and stranded wire (right)

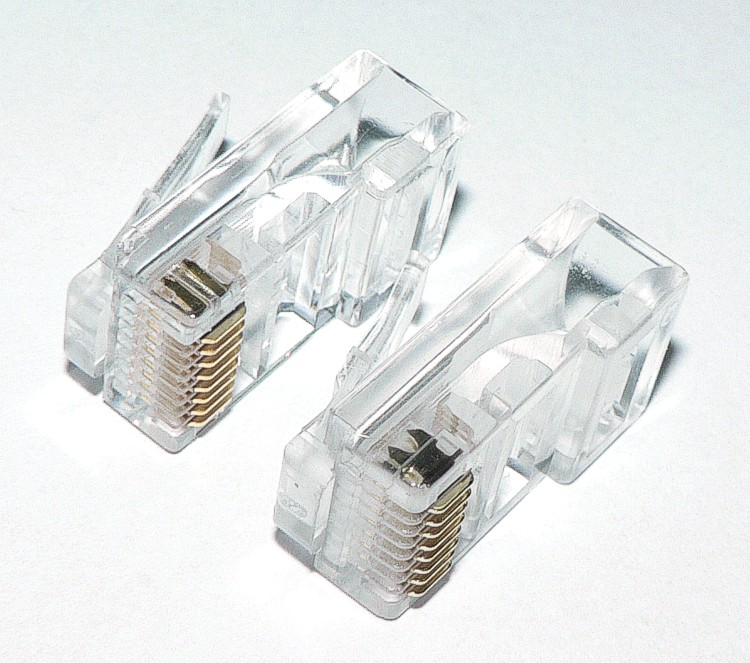
Contacts for solid wire (top left) and stranded wire (bottom right)

Internally, the contacts in the plugs have sharp prongs that, when crimped, displace the wire insulation and connect with the conductors inside—a mechanism known as insulation displacement. Cables have either solid or stranded (tinsel wire) conductors, and a given plug is designed for only one type. The sharp prongs are different in the connectors made for each type of wire, and a mismatch between plug type and wire type results in unreliable connections. A modular plug for solid (single-strand) wire often has three slightly splayed prongs on each contact to securely surround and grip the conductor while scraping along the outside, and a plug for stranded wire has prongs that are designed to pierce the insulation and go straight through to contact multiple wire strands.

=== Interchangeability ===
Some modular connectors are indexed, meaning their dimensions are intentionally non-standard, preventing connections with connectors of standard dimensions. The means of indexing may be non-standard cross-sectional dimensions or shapes, retention mechanism dimensions or configuration. For example, a Modified Modular Jack using an offset latching tab was developed by Digital Equipment Corporation to prevent accidental interchange of data and telephone cables.

Modular connector typical dimensions (millimeters)
Connector	Length	Width	Height
4P4C		7.7	
6P6C	13.34	9.85	6.60
8P8C	22.48	11.68	8.00

The dimensions of modular connectors are such that a narrower plug can be inserted into a wider jack that has more positions than the plug, leaving the jack's outermost contacts unconnected. The height of the plug's insertion area is 0.260 inches (6.60 mm) and the contacts are 0.040 inches (1.02 mm) apart (contact pitch), so the width is dependent on the number of pin positions. However, not all plugs from all manufacturers have this capability, and some jack manufacturers warn that their jacks are not designed to accept smaller plugs without damage. If an inserted plug lacks slots to accommodate the jack's contacts at the outermost extremes, it may permanently deform the outermost contacts of an incompatible jack. Excessive resistance may be encountered when inserting an incompatible plug, as the outermost contacts in the jack are forcibly deformed.

Special modular plugs have been manufactured (for example, the Siemon UP-2468) which have extra slots beyond their standard contacts, to accommodate the wider jack's outermost contacts without damage. These special plug connectors can be visually identified by carefully looking for the extra slots molded into the plug. The molded plastic bodies of the special plugs may also be colored with a light blueish tinge to aid in quick recognition. The special plugs are preferred for test equipment and adapters, which may be rapidly connected to a large number of corresponding connectors in quick succession for testing purposes. The use of the special plugs avoids inadvertent damage to the equipment under test, even when a narrower plug is inserted into a nominally incompatible wider jack.

== Termination ==
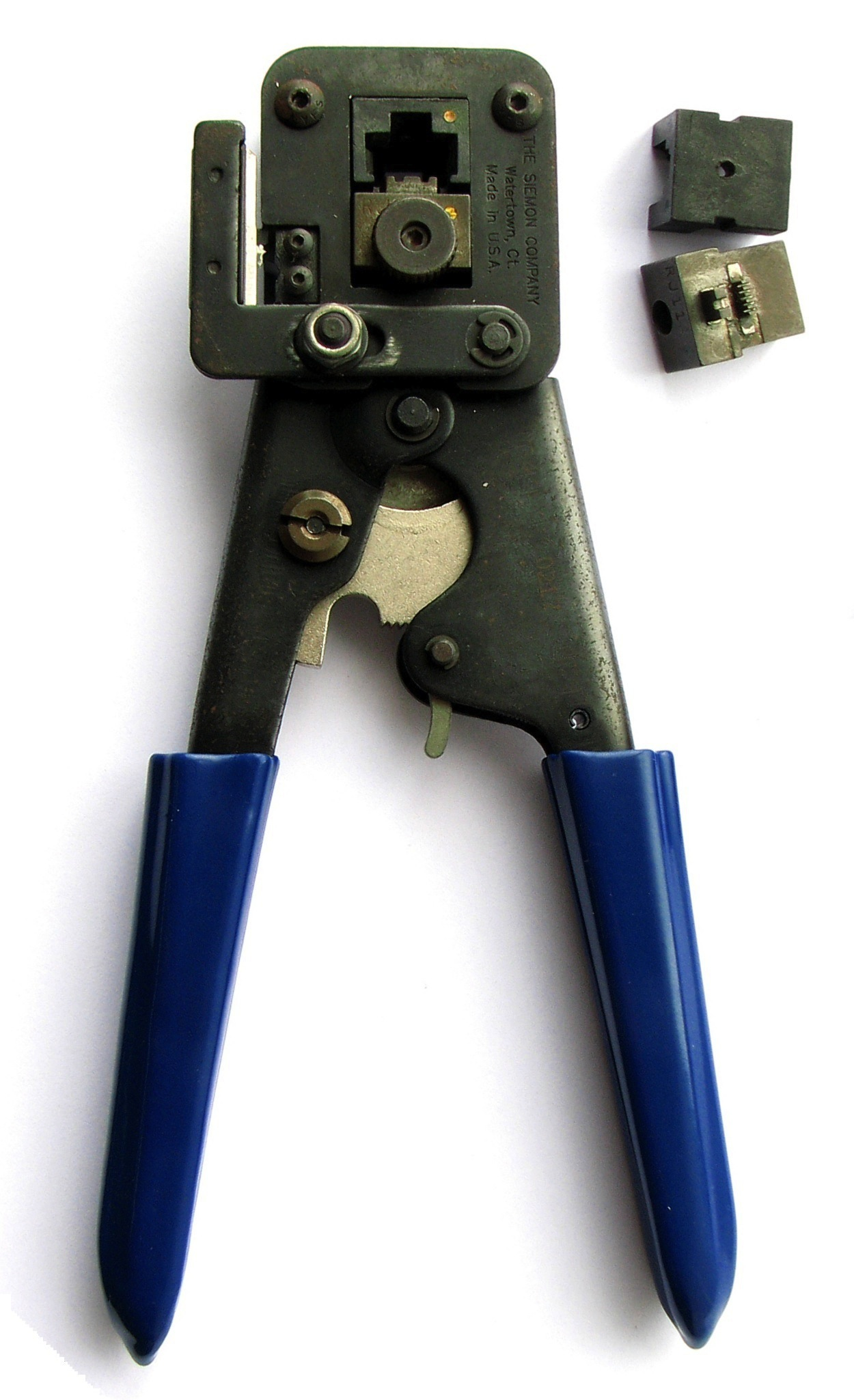
A modular plug crimping tool with exchangeable crimping dies

Termination of cables with modular connectors is similar across the various number of positions and contacts in the plug. The crimping tool contains a die that is often exchangeable and is closely matched to the shape and pin count of the modular plug.

A crimping die-set looks similar to an 8P8C jack, except for the eight teeth lining the top portion of the die. When the tool is operated, the die compresses around the 8P8C plug. As the die compresses, these teeth force the plug contacts into the conductors of the cable being terminated. The crimper may also permanently deform part of the plastic plug body in such a way that it grips the outer sheath of the cable for secure fastening and strain relief. These actions permanently attach the plug to the cable.

== Pinout ==
The contact assignments (pinout) of modular connectors vary by application. Telephone network connections are standardized by registered jack designations, and Ethernet over twisted pair is specified by the ANSI/TIA-568 standard. For other applications, standardization may be lacking; for example, multiple conventions exist for the use of 8P8C connectors in RS-232 applications. For this reason, D-sub-to-modular adapters are typically shipped with the D-sub contacts (pins or sockets) terminated but not inserted into the connector body so that the D-sub-to-modular contact pairing can be assigned as needed.

== 4P4C ==
4P4C modular connector on a handset cord.

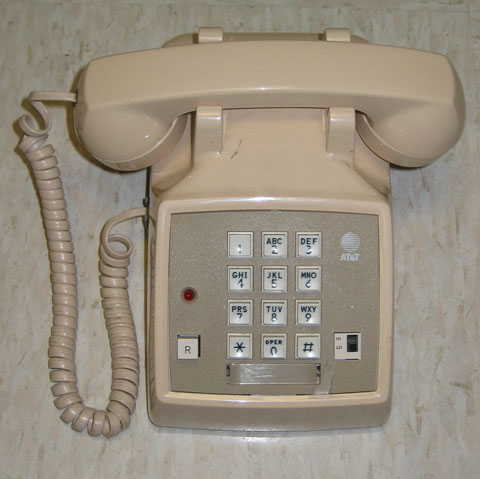
Wired telephone that uses 4P4C connectors for the coiled handset cord

The four-position four-conductor (4P4C) connector is the standard modular connector used on both ends of telephone handset cords and is therefore often called a handset connector.

This handset connector is not a registered jack, because it was not intended to connect directly to telephone lines. However, it is often referred to as RJ9, RJ10, or RJ22.

=== Handset wiring ===

Handsets and often headsets for use with telephones commonly use a 4P4C connector. The two center pins are commonly used for the receiver, and the outer pins connect the transmitter so that a reversal of conductors between the ends of a cord does not affect the signal routing. This may differ for other equipment, including hands-free headsets.

=== Data port ===
The Macintosh 128K, Macintosh 512K and Macintosh Plus from Apple as well as the Amiga 1000 from Commodore use 4P4C connectors to connect the keyboard to the main computer housing. The connector provides power to the keyboard on the outer two contacts and receives data signals on the inner pair. The cable between the computer and the keyboard is a coiled cord with an appearance very similar to a telephone handset cable. The connector on the Amiga 1000 uses crossover wiring, similar to a telephone handset. The connector wiring on the Apple computers, however, requires a polarized straight-through pinout. Using a telephone handset cable instead of the supplied cable could short out the +5 volt DC supply and damage the Apple computer or the keyboard.

Modular connectors are often used for data links, such as serial line connections, because of their compact dimensions. For example, some DirecTV set-top boxes include a 4P4C data port with an adapter cord to connect to a computer serial port to control the set-top box.

== 6P ==
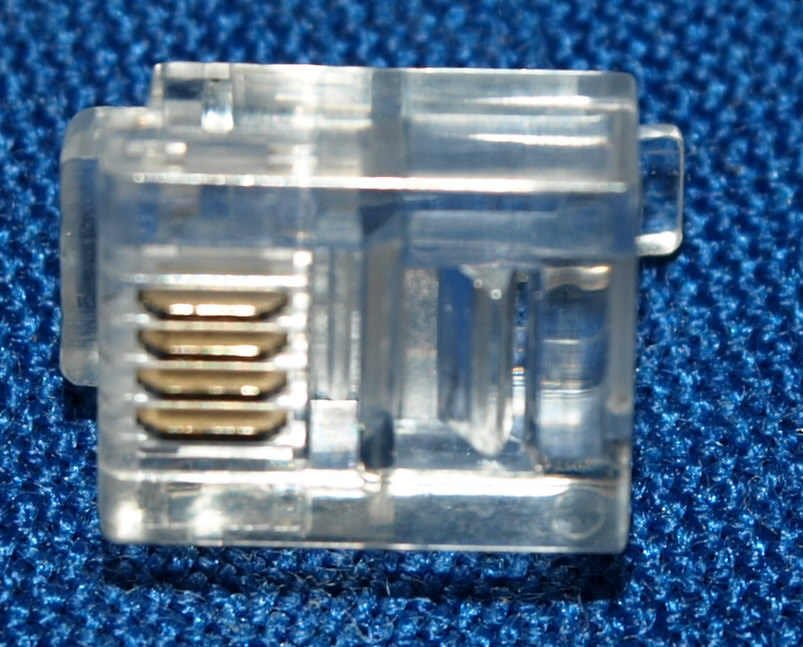
6P4C crimp-on–style connector

Modular plugs are described by the maximum number of physical contact positions and the actual number of contacts installed in these positions. The 6P2C, 6P4C, and 6P6C modular connectors are probably best known for their use as RJ11, RJ14, and RJ25 non-powered registered jacks, respectively (and 6P4C and 6P6C for powered RJ11 and RJ14, power being delivered on the outer pairs). These interfaces use the same six-position modular connector body but have different numbers of pins installed.

RJ11 is a jack, a physical interface, by definition, used for terminating a single telephone line. RJ14 is similar, but for two lines, and RJ25 is for three lines. RJ61 is a similar registered jack for four lines, but uses 8P8C connectors.

=== RJ11 wiring ===
Cables sold as RJ11 (the name of a single-jack, not a cable) often actually use 6P4C connectors (six positions, four contacts). Two of its six possible contact positions connect tip and ring of a single telephone line, and the other two contact positions may be unused, carry a second line, or provide low-voltage power for a night light or other features on the telephone set. In some installations, an extra contact was also required for the ground connection for selective ringers.

=== Pinout ===
The pins of the 6P6C connector are numbered 1 to 6, counting left to right when holding the connector tab side down with the opening for the cable facing the viewer.

Position	Pair	T/R	±	RJ11	RJ14	RJ25	Twisted pair colors	25-pair colors (Note: Established in the 1950s for polyethylene-insulated conductor (PIC) cable.Horn, F. W. (October 1958). "'Even-Count' Cable" (PDF). Bell Laboratories Record. 37 (5): 208–217.)	Old colors (Note: While the old solid color code was well established for pair 1 and usually pair 2, there are several conflicting conventions for pair 3 (and sometimes even pair 2). The colors shown above were taken from a vendor of silver satin flat 8-conductor phone cable that claims to be standard. 6-pair solid (old) bellwire cables previously used by the Bell System use white for pair 3 tip but some vendors' cable may substitute orange for white. At least one other vendor of flat 8-conductor cable uses the sequence blue, orange, black, red, green, yellow, brown and white/slate.)	German colors (Note: This color scheme originates in the (withdrawn) national standard DIN 47100. The scheme shown here is the correct color code for interfacing with the RJ connector standards.)	Australian colors	Dutch colors	Diagram
1	3	T	+			T3	white/green	white/green	white	pink	orange		6P6C connector showing the location of pin 1
2	2	T	+		T2	T2	white/orange	white/orange	black	green	red	orange	6P6C connector showing the location of pin 1
3	1	R	−	R1	R1	R1	blue	blue/white	red	white	blue	red	6P6C connector showing the location of pin 1
4	1	T	+	T1	T1	T1	white/blue	white/blue	green	brown	white	blue	6P6C connector showing the location of pin 1
5	2	R	−		R2	R2	orange	orange/white	yellow	yellow	black	white	6P6C connector showing the location of pin 1
6	3	R	−			R3	green	green/white	blue	gray	green		6P6C connector showing the location of pin 1

However, with German domestic telephone equipment, and that in some neighboring countries, 6P4C plugs and sockets are typically only used to connect the telephone cord to the phone base unit, whereas the mechanically different TAE connector is used at the other end to connect to a service provider interface. Older base units may accommodate the additional connectors of TAE (E, W, a2, b2) and may feature non-RJ standard sockets that can be connected directly to TAE plugs. Further, flat DIN 47100 cables typically place the wires in ascending order. When used directly with 6P4C plugs, the color coding may be undetermined.

=== Powered version of RJ11 ===
In the powered version of the RJ11 interface, pins 2 and 5 (black and yellow) may carry low-voltage AC or DC power. While the telephone line on pins 3 and 4 (red and green) supplies enough power for most telephone terminals, old telephone terminals with incandescent lights, such as the Western Electric Princess and Trimline telephones, need more power than the phone line can supply. Typically, the power on pins 2 and 5 is supplied by an AC adapter plugged into a nearby power outlet, which potentially even supplies power to all of the jacks in the house.

=== Compatibility with structured cabling ===
Structured cabling networks adhering to ANSI/TIA-568, ISO/IEC 11801 (or ISO/IEC 15018 for home networks) are widely used for both computer networking and analog telephony. These standards specify the T568A or T568B wiring arrangements compatible with Ethernet. The 8P8C jack used by structured cabling physically accepts the 6-position connector that fits RJ11, RJ14 and RJ25. Only lines 1 and 2 have electrical compatibility, with T568A wiring, and only line 1 with T568B wiring, because Ethernet-compatible pin assignments split the third pair of RJ25 across two separate cable pairs, rendering that pair unusable by an analog phone. (With T568B wiring, a telephone may connect to line 3 as line 2.) Both the third and fourth pairs of RJ61 are similarly split. The incompatible T568A and T568B layouts were necessary to preserve the electrical properties of the third and fourth pairs for Ethernet, which operates at much higher frequencies than analog telephony. Because of these incompatibilities, and because RJ25 and RJ61 were never very common, the T568A and T568B conventions have largely displaced RJ25 and RJ61 for telephones with more than two lines.

== 8P8C ==
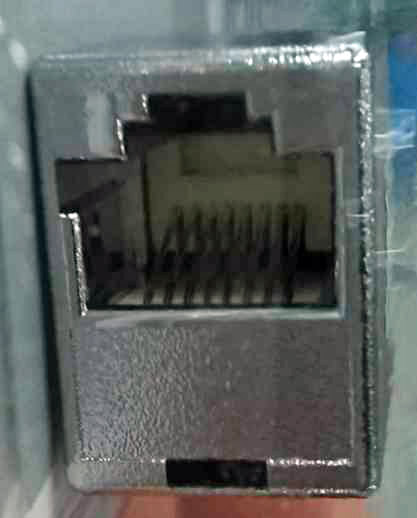
An 8P8C female modular connector with a key cut (the connector used in the obsolete RJ45S specification)

The 8 position 8 contact (8P8C) connector is a modular connector commonly used to terminate twisted pair and multi-conductor flat cable. These connectors are commonly used for Ethernet over twisted pair, registered jacks and other telephone applications, RS-232 serial communication using the ANSI/TIA-568 (formerly TIA/EIA-568) and Yost standards, and other applications involving unshielded twisted pair, shielded twisted pair, and multi-conductor flat cable.

An 8P8C modular connection consists of a male plug and a female jack, each with eight equally spaced contacts. On the plug, the contacts are flat metal bars positioned parallel to the connector body. Inside the jack, the contacts are metal spring wires angled away from the insertion interface. When the plug is mated with the jack, the contacts meet and create an electrical connection. The spring force of the jack contacts ensures a good interface.

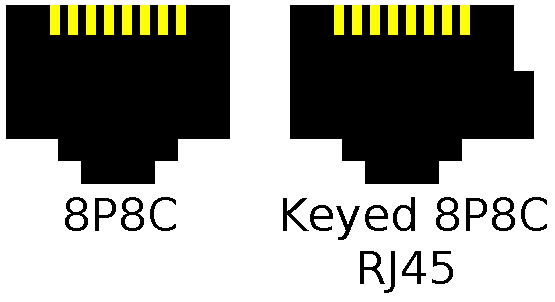
Left: Generic 8P8C (or 8PMJ, 8-position modular jack) male connector. Right: 8P8C male connector with key, which mates with RJ41S, RJ45S, and RJ48S

Although commonly referred to as RJ45 in the context of Ethernet and structured cabling, RJ45 originally referred to a specific wiring configuration of an 8P8C female connector. The original telephone-system-standard RJ45 plug has a key that excludes insertion in an un-keyed 8P8C socket.

The original RJ45S (Note: The often omitted S suffix indicates this is a wiring configuration supporting a single telephone line.) was intended for high-speed modems and is obsolete. The RJ45S jack mates with a keyed 8P2C modular plug, and has pins 4 and 5 (the middle positions) wired for the ring and tip conductors of a single telephone line and pins 7 and 8 shorting a programming resistor. This is a different mechanical interface and wiring scheme than ANSI/TIA-568 T568A and T568B schemes with the 8P8C connector in Ethernet and telephone applications. Generic 8P8C modular connectors are similar to those used for the RJ45S variant, although the RJ45S plug is keyed and not compatible with non-keyed 8P8C modular jacks.

Telephone installers who wired RJ45S modem jacks or RJ61X telephone jacks were familiar with the pin assignments of the standard. However, the standard unkeyed modular connectors became ubiquitous for computer networking and informally inherited the name RJ45.

=== Standardization ===
The shape and dimensions of an 8P8C modular connector are specified for US telephone applications by the Administrative Council for Terminal Attachment (ACTA) in national standard ANSI/TIA-1096-A and international standard ISO-8877. This standard does not use the short term 8P8C and covers more than just 8P8C modular connectors, but the 8P8C modular connector type is the eight-position connector type described therein, with eight contacts installed.

For data communication applications (LAN, structured cabling), International Standard IEC 60603 specifies in parts 7-1, 7-2, 7-4, 7-5, and 7-7 not only the same physical dimensions but also high-frequency performance requirements for shielded and unshielded versions of this connector for carrying frequencies up to 100, 250 and 600 MHz.

=== Pinout ===
T568A wiring, defined in TIA-568

T568B wiring, defined in TIA-568

8P8C connectors are frequently terminated using the T568A or T568B assignments that are defined in ANSI/TIA-568. The drawings to the right show that the copper connections and pairing are the same; the only difference is that the orange and green pairs (colors) are swapped. A cable wired as T568A at one end and wired as T568B at the other end (Tx and Rx pairs reversed) is an Ethernet crossover cable. Before the widespread acceptance of auto MDI-X capabilities, a crossover cable was needed to interconnect similar network equipment (such as Ethernet hubs to Ethernet hubs). Crossover cables are sometimes still used to connect two computers together without a switch or hub; however, most network interface cards (NIC) in use today implement auto MDI-X to automatically configure themselves based on the type of cable plugged into them. A cable wired the same at both ends is called a patch or straight-through cable, because no pin/pair assignments are swapped. If a patch or straight cable is used to connect two computers with auto-MDI-X capable NICs, one NIC will configure itself to swap the functions of its Tx and Rx wire pairs.

Pin	T568A pair	T568A color	T568B pair	T568B color	10BASE-T, 100BASE-TX signal	1000BASE-T, 10GBASE-T signal	Wire	Diagram
1	3	white/green stripe	2	white/orange stripe	TD+	DA+	tip	8P8C pin numbering on plug face. Connected pins on plug and jack have the same number.
2	3	green solid	2	orange solid	TD−	DA−	ring	8P8C pin numbering on plug face. Connected pins on plug and jack have the same number.
3	2	white/orange stripe	3	white/green stripe	RD+	DB+	tip	8P8C pin numbering on plug face. Connected pins on plug and jack have the same number.
4	1	blue solid	1	blue solid	not used	DC+	ring	8P8C pin numbering on plug face. Connected pins on plug and jack have the same number.
5	1	white/blue stripe	1	white/blue stripe	not used	DC−	tip	8P8C pin numbering on plug face. Connected pins on plug and jack have the same number.
6	2	orange solid	3	green solid	RD−	DB−	ring	8P8C pin numbering on plug face. Connected pins on plug and jack have the same number.
7	4	white/brown stripe	4	white/brown stripe	not used	DD+	tip	8P8C pin numbering on plug face. Connected pins on plug and jack have the same number.
8	4	brown solid	4	brown solid	not used	DD−	ring	8P8C pin numbering on plug face. Connected pins on plug and jack have the same number.

=== Types and compatibility ===
Two types of 8P8C plugs and crimping tools for installing the plug onto a cable are commonly available: Western Electric/Stewart Stamping (WE/SS) and Tyco/AMP. While the two types are similar, the tooling and plug types cannot be interchanged. (Note: WE/SS and Tyco/AMP 8P8C plugs have different spacings for the cable strain relief. Using a WE/SS 8P8C crimp die set on a Tyco/AMP 8P8C plug crushes the top of the connector and damages the crimp die set, and vice versa.) WE/SS compatible plugs are available from a large number of manufacturers, whereas Tyco/AMP plugs are produced exclusively by Tyco Electronics. Both types of modular plugs can be mated with a standard 8P8C modular jack.

Both types of 8P8C plugs are available in shielded and unshielded varieties for different attenuation tolerances as needed. Shielded plugs are more expensive and require shielded cable, but have a lower attenuation, and may reduce electromagnetic interference.

Although a narrower 4-pin and 6-pin plug fits into the wider 8-pin jack and makes a connection with the available contacts on the plug, because the body of the smaller connector may stress the remaining contacts, (Note: The body of a 6P6C or 4P4C plug typically projects out by more than one millimeter further than the contacts and presses the outermost contacts of the larger connector further than if a full-size connector were inserted.) the smaller connector can potentially damage the springs of the larger jack.

=== Applications ===
8P8C connectors are commonly used in computer networking applications, where interconnecting cables are terminated at each end with an 8P8C modular plug wired according to TIA/EIA standards. Most wired Ethernet communications are carried over Category 5e or Category 6 cable terminated with 8P8C modular plugs. The connector is also used in other telecommunications connections, including ISDN and T1.

Where building network and telephone wiring is pre-installed, the center (blue) pair is often used to carry telephony signals. While this allows an RJ11 plug to connect, it may damage the modular jack; an approved converter prevents damage. In landline telephony, an 8P8C jack is used at the point a line enters the building to allow the line to be broken to insert automatic dialing equipment, including intrusion alarm panels.

The EIA/TIA-561 standard describes the use of 8P8C connectors for RS-232 serial interfaces. This application is common as a console interface for network equipment, such as switches, routers, and headless computers.

8P8C modular connectors are also commonly used as a microphone connector for PMR, LMR, and amateur radio transceivers. Frequently, the pinout is different, usually mirrored (i.e. what would be pins 1 to 8 in the ANSI/TIA-568 standard might be pins 8 to 1 in the radio and its manual).

In analog mobile telephony, the 8P8C connector was used to connect an AMPS cellular handset to its (separate) base unit; this usage is now obsolete.

The physical connector is standardized as the IEC 60603-7 8P8C modular connector with different categories of performance. The physical dimensions of the male and female connectors are specified in ANSI/TIA-1096-A and ISO-8877 standards and normally wired to the T568A and T568B pinouts specified in the ANSI/TIA-568 standard to be compatible with both telephone and Ethernet.

A similar standard jack once used for modem and data connections, the RJ45S, used a keyed variety of the 8P8C body with an extra tab that prevents it from mating with other connectors; the visual difference compared to the more common 8P8C is subtle, but it is a different connector. The original RJ45S keyed 8P2C modular connector, obsolete today, had pins 5 and 4 wired for tip and ring of a single telephone line and pins 7 and 8 shorting a programming resistor.

Electronics catalogs commonly advertise 8P8C modular connectors as RJ45. An installer can wire the jack to any pin-out or use it as part of a generic structured cabling system such as ISO/IEC 15018 or ISO/IEC 11801 using 8P8C patch panels for both phone and data.

== 10P10C ==
The pin arrangement for a 10P10C socket

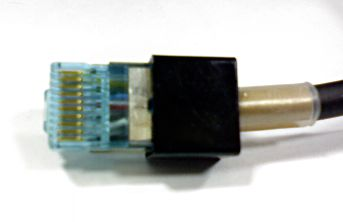
A 10P10C plug

The 10P10C connector is commonly referred to as an RJ50 connector, although this was never a standard registered jack. The 10P10C has 10 contact positions and 10 contacts.

The most common uses of the 10P10C connector are in proprietary data transfer systems.

== Standards ==
- ANSI/TIA-968-A:
- ANSI/TIA-1096-A: Telecommunications telephone terminal equipment connector requirements for connection of terminal equipment to the telephone network
- IEC 60603-7-1: Connectors for electronic equipment: Part 7-1: Detail specification for 8-way, shielded free and fixed connectors with common mating features, with assessed quality
- IEC 60603-7-2: Connectors for electronic equipment: Part 7-2: Detail specification for 8-way, unshielded, free and fixed connectors, for data transmissions with frequencies up to 100 MHz
- IEC 60603-7-4: Connectors for electronic equipment: Part 7-4: Detail specification for 8-way, unshielded, free and fixed connectors, for data transmissions with frequencies up to 250 MHz
- IEC 60603-7-5: Connectors for electronic equipment: Part 7-5: Detail specification for 8-way, shielded, free and fixed connectors, for data transmissions with frequencies up to 250 MHz
- IEC 60603-7-7: Connectors for electronic equipment: Part 7-7: Detail specification for 8-way, shielded, free and fixed connectors, for data transmissions with frequencies up to 600 MHz
- ISO/IEC 8877, EN 28877: Information Technology—Telecommunications and Information Exchange between Systems—Interface Connector and Contact Assignments for ISDN Basic Access Interface Located at Reference Points S and T
- US government documents define registered jack applications of modular connectors for telecommunications. (Note: 4P4C and 10P10C connectors are not defined in these standards.) See Registered jack § History and authority

== See also ==
- BS 6312—British equivalent to RJ25
- EtherCON—ruggedized 8P8C Ethernet connector
- GG45
- TERA
- XJACK—retractable 8P8C Ethernet connector

== Bibliography ==
- Trulove, James (December 19, 2005), LAN wiring (3rd ed.), McGraw-Hill Professional, ISBN 0-07-145975-8.
