= Ethernet over twisted pair =

Ethernet physical layers using twisted-pair cables

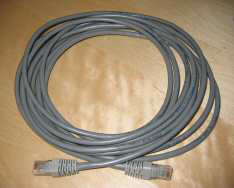
Standard twisted-pair cable usable for most common types of Ethernet

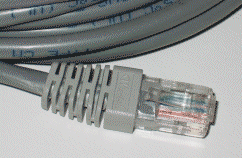
8P8C plug

Ethernet over twisted-pair technologies use twisted-pair cables for the physical layer of an Ethernet computer network. They are a subset of all Ethernet physical layers.

Early Ethernet used various grades of coaxial cable, but in 1984, StarLAN showed the potential of simple unshielded twisted pair. This led to the development of 10BASE-T and its successors 100BASE-TX, 1000BASE-T, 10GBASE-T and 40GBASE-T, supporting speeds of 10 and 100 megabits per second, then 1, 10 and 40 gigabits per second respectively. (Note: Generally, the higher-speed implementations support the lower-speed standards making it possible to mix different generations of equipment; with the inclusive capability designated 10/100 or 10/100/1000 for connections that support such combinations.)

Ethernet over a single twisted pair, known as single-pair Ethernet (SPE), has entered commercial use. Two new variants of 10-megabit-per-second Ethernet over a single twisted pair, known as 10BASE-T1S and 10BASE-T1L, were standardized in IEEE Std 802.3cg-2019. 10BASE-T1S has its origins in the automotive industry and may be useful in other short-distance applications where substantial electrical noise is present. 10BASE-T1L is a long-distance Ethernet, supporting connections up to 1 km in length. Both of these standards are finding applications in implementing the Internet of things. 10BASE-T1S is a direct competitor of CAN XL in the automotive space and includes a PHY-Level Collision Avoidance scheme (PLCA).

The earlier standards use 8P8C modular connectors (Note: The 8P8C modular connector is often called RJ45 after a telephone industry standard.) and supported cable standards range from Category 3 to Category 8. These cables typically have four pairs of wires for each connection, although early Ethernet used only two of the pairs. Unlike the earlier -T standards, the -T1 interfaces were designed to operate over a single pair of conductors and introduce the use of two new connectors referred to as IEC 63171-1 and IEC 63171-6.

== History ==
The first two early designs of twisted-pair networking were StarLAN, standardized by the IEEE Standards Association as IEEE 802.3e in 1986, at one megabit per second, and LattisNet, developed in January 1987, at 10 megabits per second. Both were developed before the 10BASE-T standard (published in 1990 as IEEE 802.3i) and used different signaling, so they were not directly compatible with it.

In 1988, AT&T released StarLAN 10, named for working at 10 Mbit/s. The StarLAN 10 signaling was used as the basis of 10BASE-T, with the addition of link beat to quickly indicate connection status. (Note: By switching link beat on or off, a number of network interface cards at the time could work with either StarLAN 10 or 10BASE-T.)

Using twisted-pair cabling in a star topology addressed several weaknesses of the previous Ethernet standards:

- Twisted-pair cables were already in use for telephone service and were already present in many office buildings, lowering the overall cost of deployment.
- The centralized star topology was also already often in use for telephone service cabling, as opposed to the bus topology required by earlier Ethernet standards.
- Using point-to-point links was less prone to failure and greatly simplified troubleshooting compared to a shared bus.
- Exchanging cheap repeater hubs for more advanced switching hubs provided a viable upgrade path.
- Mixing different speeds in a single network became possible with the arrival of Fast Ethernet.
- Depending on cable grades, subsequent upgrading to Gigabit Ethernet or faster could be accomplished by replacing the network switches.

Although 10BASE-T is rarely used as a normal-operation signaling rate today, it is still in wide use with network interface controllers in wake-on-LAN power-down mode and for special, low-power, low-bandwidth applications. 10BASE-T is still supported on most twisted-pair Ethernet ports with up to Gigabit Ethernet speed.

== Naming ==
The common names for the standards derive from aspects of the physical media. The leading number (10 in 10BASE-T) refers to the transmission speed in Mbit/s. BASE denotes that baseband transmission is used. The T designates twisted-pair cable. Where there are several standards for the same transmission speed, they are distinguished by a letter or digit following the T, such as TX or T4, referring to the encoding method and number of lanes.

== Cabling ==
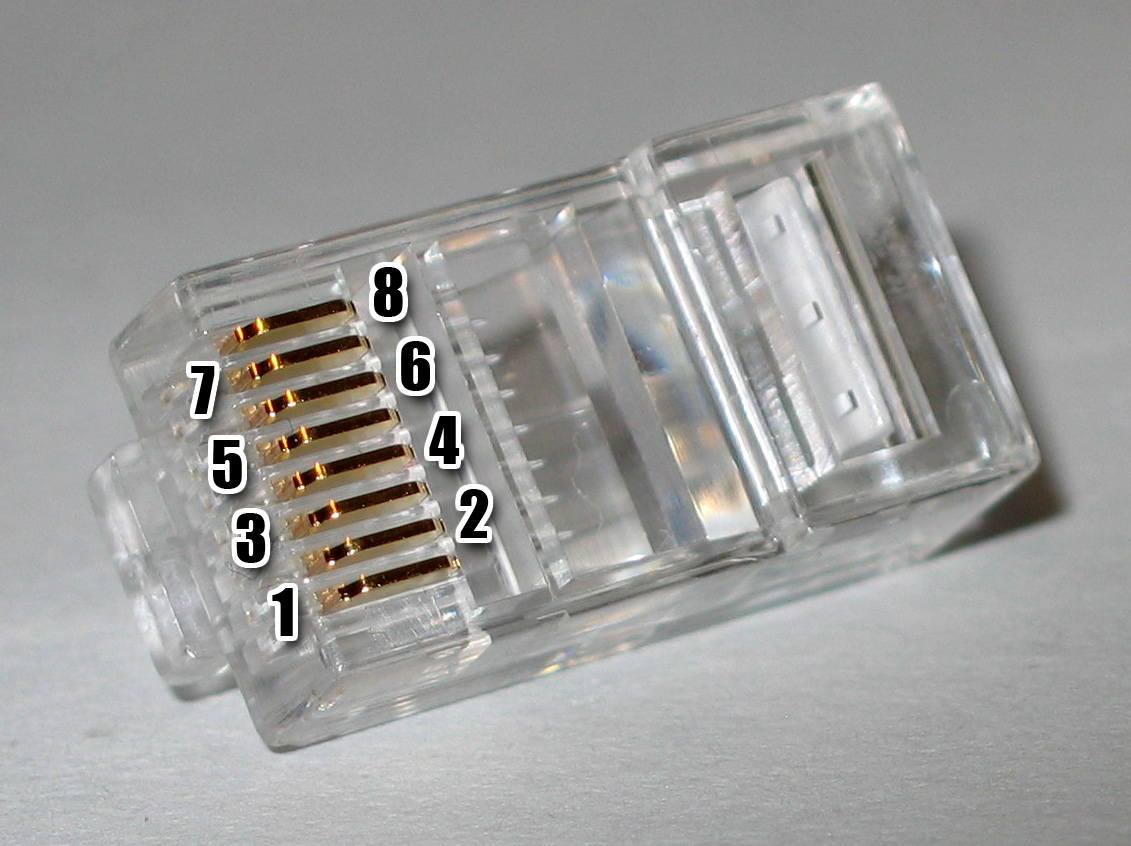
8P8C modular plug pin positioning

ANSI/TIA-568 T568A termination
Pin	Pair	Wire (Note: The terms used in the explanations of the 568 standards, tip and ring, refer to older communication technologies, and equate to the positive and negative parts of the connections.)	Color
1	3	tip	white/green
2	3	ring	green
3	2	tip	white/orange
4	1	ring	blue
5	1	tip	white/blue
6	2	ring	orange
7	4	tip	white/brown
8	4	ring	brown

ANSI/TIA-568 T568B termination
Pin	Pair	Wire	Color
1	2	tip	white/orange
2	2	ring	orange
3	3	tip	white/green
4	1	ring	blue
5	1	tip	white/blue
6	3	ring	green
7	4	tip	white/brown
8	4	ring	brown

Most Ethernet cables are wired straight-through (pin 1 to pin 1, pin 2 to pin 2, and so on). In some instances, the crossover form (receive to transmit and transmit to receive) may still be required.

A cable for Ethernet may be wired to either the T568A or T568B termination standard at both ends of the cable. Since these standards differ only in that they swap the positions of pairs 2 and 3 – the only pairs used by the formerly common 10BASE-T and 100BASE-TX – a cable with T568A wiring at one end and T568B at the other functions as a crossover cable for the older, two-pair standards.

A 10BASE-T or 100BASE-TX host normally uses connector wiring called medium-dependent interface (MDI), transmitting on pins 1 and 2 and receiving on pins 3 and 6. An infrastructure node (such as a hub or a switch) normally uses the complementary wiring arrangement, called MDI-X, the X standing for -crossover. MDI-X simply reverses the pairs, transmitting on pins 3 and 6 and receiving on pins 1 and 2. These ports are connected using a straight-through cable so each transmitter talks to the receiver on the other end of the cable. (Modern twisted-pair Ethernet uses all four pairs differently, and the MDI–MDI-X distinction does not apply.)

Later equipment often can automatically switch between MDI and MDI-X arrangements as needed, obviating crossover cables and manual selection, but in the conventional arrangement, when two nodes having the same (fixed) type of port need to be connected, a crossover cable is required. If both devices being connected support 1000BASE-T, they will connect regardless of whether a straight-through or crossover cable is used.

A 10BASE-T transmitter sends two differential voltages, +2.5 V or −2.5 V. A 100BASE-TX transmitter sends three differential voltages, +1 V, 0 V, or −1 V. Unlike earlier Ethernet standards using broadband and coaxial cable, such as 10BASE5 (thicknet) and 10BASE2 (thinnet), 10BASE-T does not specify the exact type of wiring to be used but instead specifies certain characteristics that a cable must meet. This was done in anticipation of using 10BASE-T in existing twisted-pair wiring systems that did not conform to any specified wiring standard. Some of the specified characteristics are attenuation, characteristic impedance, propagation delay, and several types of crosstalk. Cable testers are widely available to check these parameters to determine if a cable can be used with 10BASE-T. These characteristics are expected to be met by 100 meters of 24-gauge unshielded twisted-pair cable. However, with high-quality cabling, reliable cable runs of 150 meters or longer are often achievable and are considered viable by technicians familiar with the 10BASE-T specification.

100BASE-TX follows the same wiring patterns as 10BASE-T, but is more sensitive to wire quality and length, due to the higher bit rates.

1000BASE-T uses all four pairs bi-directionally using hybrid circuits and cancellers. Data is encoded using 4D-PAM5; four dimensions using pulse-amplitude modulation (PAM) with five voltages, −2 V, −1 V, 0 V, +1 V, and +2 V. While +2 V to −2 V may appear at the pins of the line driver, the voltage on the cable is nominally +1 V, +0.5 V, 0 V, −0.5 V and −1 V.

100BASE-TX and 1000BASE-T were both designed to require a minimum of Category 5 cable and also specify a maximum cable length of 100 metres (330 ft).

=== Shared cable ===
10BASE-T and 100BASE-TX require only two pairs (pins 1–2, 3–6) to operate. Since common Category 5 cable has four pairs, it is possible to use the spare pairs (pins 4–5, 7–8) in 10- and 100-Mbit/s configurations for other purposes. The spare pairs may be used for power over Ethernet (PoE), for two plain old telephone service (POTS) lines, or for a second 10BASE-T or 100BASE-TX connection. In practice, great care must be taken to separate these pairs as 10/100-Mbit/s Ethernet equipment electrically terminates the unused pins ("Bob Smith Termination"). Shared cable is not an option for Gigabit Ethernet as 1000BASE-T requires all four pairs to operate.

=== Single-pair ===
In addition to the more computer-oriented two and four-pair variants, the 10BASE-T1, 100BASE-T1 and 1000BASE-T1 single-pair Ethernet (SPE) physical layers are intended for automotive, IoT, and M2M applications or as optional data channels in other interconnect applications. The distances that single pair operates at full duplex depends on the speed: 1000 m (1 km) with 802.3cg-2019 10BASE-T1L; 15 m (49 ft) with 100BASE-T1 (link segment type A); up to 40 m (130 ft) using 1000BASE-T1 link segment type B with up to four in-line connectors. Both physical layers require a balanced twisted pair with an impedance of 100 Ω. The cable must be capable of transmitting 600 MHz for 1000BASE-T1 and 66 MHz for 100BASE-T1. 2.5 Gbit/s, 5 Gbit/s, and 10 Gbit/s over a 15 m single pair is standardized in 802.3ch-2020. In June 2023, 802.3cy added 25 Gbit/s speeds at lengths up to 11 m.

Similar to PoE, Power over Data Lines (PoDL) can provide up to 50 W to a device.

Single-pair Ethernet (SPE)
Wire colour	PMA Signal
Blue	BI_DA+
White	BI_DA−

== Connectors ==
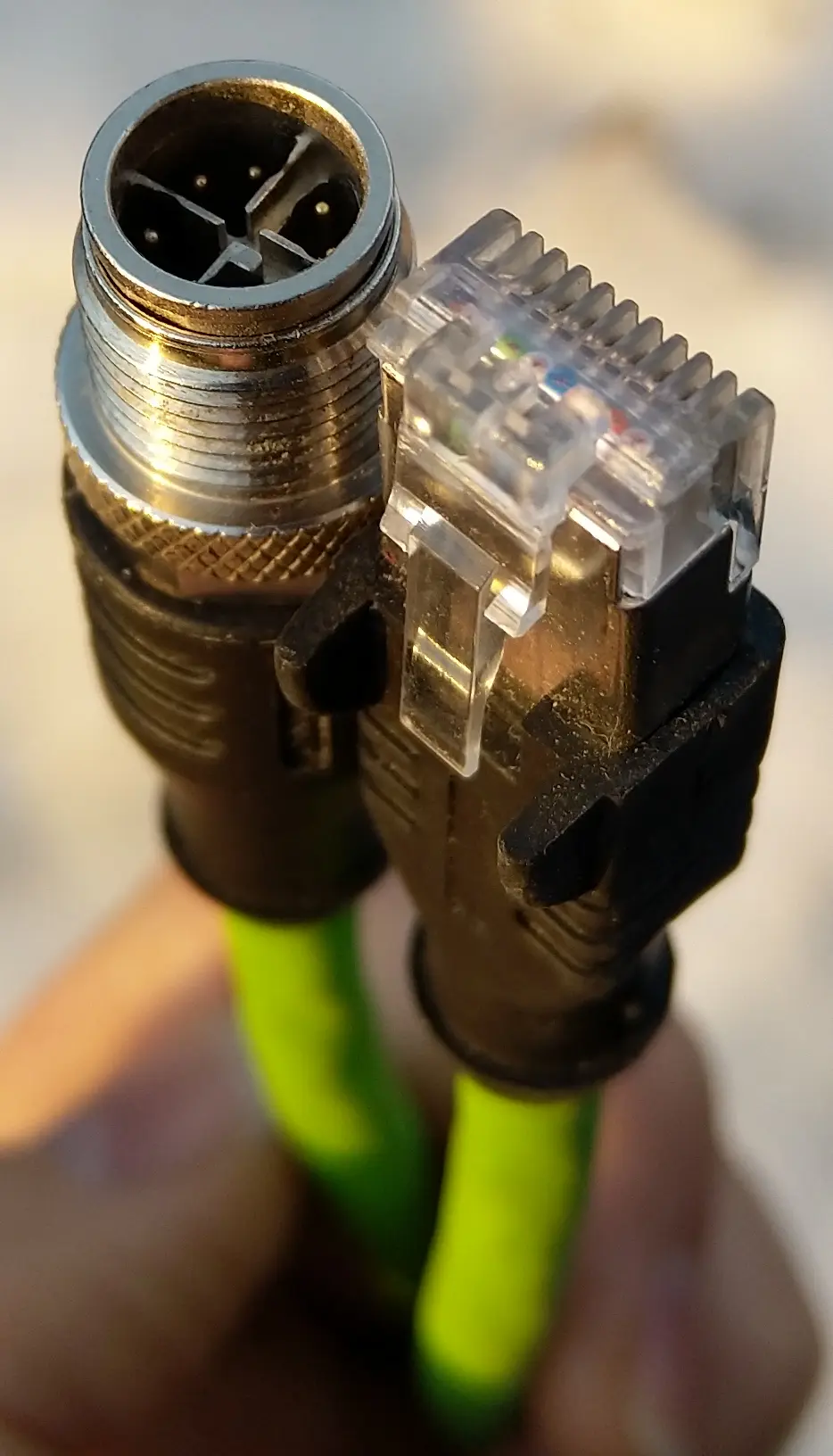
Cat 6A cable with an M12X connector in one end and a modular connector in the other

- 8P8C modular connector: For stationary uses in controlled environments, from homes to datacenters, this is the dominant connector. Its fragile locking tab otherwise limits its suitability and durability. Bandwidths supporting up to Cat 8 cabling are defined for this connector format.
- M12X: This is the M12 connector designated for Ethernet, standardized as IEC 61076-2-109. It is a 12 mm metal screw that houses 4 shielded pairs of pins. Nominal bandwidth is 500 MHz (Cat 6A). The connector family is used in chemically and mechanically harsh environments, such as factory automation and transportation. Its size is similar to the modular connector.
- Single-pair Ethernet defines its own connectors:
  - IEC 63171-1 LC: This is a 2-pin connector with a similar locking tab to the modular connector, if thicker.
  - IEC 63171-6 industrial: This standard defines five 2-pin connectors that differ in their locking mechanisms, and one 4-pin connector with dedicated pins for power. The locking mechanisms range from a metal locking tab to M8 and M12 connectors with screw or push-pull locking. The 4-pin connector is only defined with M8 screw locking.

== Autonegotiation and duplex ==
Ethernet over twisted-pair standards up through Gigabit Ethernet define both full-duplex and half-duplex communication. However, half-duplex operation for gigabit speed is not supported by any existing hardware. Higher speed standards, 2.5GBASE-T up to 40GBASE-T running at 2.5 to 40 Gbit/s, consequently define only full-duplex point-to-point links which are generally connected by network switches, and do not support the traditional shared-medium CSMA/CD operation.

Many different modes of operations (10BASE-T half-duplex, 10BASE-T full-duplex, 100BASE-TX half-duplex, etc.) exist for Ethernet over twisted pair, and most network adapters are capable of different modes of operation. Autonegotiation is required in order to make a working 1000BASE-T connection.

When two linked interfaces are set to different duplex modes, the effect of this duplex mismatch is a network that functions much more slowly than its nominal speed. Duplex mismatch may be inadvertently caused when an administrator configures an interface to a fixed mode (e.g. 100 Mbit/s full-duplex) and fails to configure the remote interface, leaving it set to autonegotiate. Then, when the auto-negotiation process fails, half-duplex is assumed by the autonegotiating side of the link.

== Variants ==

Comparison of twisted-pair-based Ethernet physical transport layers (TP-PHYs)
Name	Standard (IEEE 802.3 clause number)	Status	Speed (Mbit/s) (Note: Transfer speed = lanes × bits per hertz × spectral bandwidth)	Pairs required	Lanes per direction	Data rate efficiency (bit/s/Hz) (Note: Effective bit/s per hertz per lane after loss to encoding overhead)	Line code	Symbol rate per lane (MBd)	Bandwidth (MHz) (Note: The spectral bandwidth is the maximum rate at which the signal will complete one cycle. It is typically half the symbol rate, because one can send a symbol both at the positive and negative peaks of the cycle. Exceptions are 10BASE-T where it is equal because it uses Manchester code, and 100BASE-TX where it is one quarter because it uses MLT-3 encoding.)	Max distance (m)	Cable (Note: At shorter cable length, it is possible to use cables of a lower grade than required for 100 m. For example, it is possible to use 10GBASE-T on a Cat 6 cable of 55 m or less. Likewise, 5GBASE-T is expected to work with Cat 5e in most use cases.)	Cable rating (MHz)	Intended usage
StarLAN-1 1BASE5	802.3e-1987	obsolete	1	2	1	1	PE	1	1	250	Cat 2	~12	LAN
StarLAN-10	802.3e-1988	obsolete	10	2	1	1	PE	10	10	~100	Cat 3	~12	LAN
LattisNet	pre 802.3i-1990	obsolete	10	2	1	1	PE	10	10	100	Cat 3	~12	LAN
10BASE-T	802.3i-1990 (CL14)	legacy	10	2	1	1	PE	10	10	100	Cat 3	16	LAN
10BASE-T1S	802.3cg-2019 (CL147)	current	10	1	1	0.8	4B5B DME	25	12.5	15 or 25 (Note: 15 m for point-to-point links, 25 m for mixing/multi-tap segments)	SPE	25	Automotive, IoT, M2M
10BASE-T1L	802.3cg-2019 (CL146)	current	10	1	1	2.66̅	4B3T PAM-3	7.5	3.75	1,000	SPE	20	Automotive, IoT, M2M
100BASE-T1	802.3bw-2015 (CL96)	current	100	1	1	3	3B2T PAM-3	66.66̅	33.33̅	15	SPE	100	Automotive, IoT, M2M
100BaseVG	802.12-1995	obsolete	100	4	4	1.66̅	5B6B Half-duplex only	30	15	100	Cat 3	16	Market failure
100BASE-T4	802.3u-1995 (CL23)	obsolete	100	4	3	2.66̅	8B6T PAM-3 Half-duplex only	25	12.5	100	Cat 3	16	Market failure
100BASE-T2	802.3y-1997 (CL32)	obsolete	100	2	2	4	LFSR PAM-5	25	12.5	100	Cat 3	16	Market failure
100BASE-TX	802.3u-1995 (CL25)	current	100	2	1	3.2	4B5B MLT-3 NRZ-I	125	31.25	100	Cat 5	100	LAN
1000BASE‑TX	802.3ab-1999 (CL25), TIA/EIA 854 (2001)	obsolete	1,000	4	2	4	PAM-5	250	125	100	Cat 6	250	Market failure
1000BASE‑T	802.3ab-1999 (CL40)	current	1,000	4	4	4	TCM 4D-PAM-5	125	62.5	100	Cat 5	100	LAN
1000BASE-T1	802.3bp-2016 (CL97)	current	1,000	1	1	2.66̅	PAM-3 80B/81B RS-FEC	750	375	40	SPE	500	Automotive, IoT, M2M
2.5GBASE-T	802.3bz-2016 (CL126)	current	2,500	4	4	6.25	64B65B PAM-16 128-DSQ	200	100	100	Cat 5e	100	LAN
2.5GBASE-T1	802.3ch-2020 (CL149)	current	2,500	1	1	3.55̅	64B/65B PAM-4 RS-FEC	1,406.25	703.125	15	SPE	1,000	Automotive, IoT, M2M
5GBASE-T	802.3bz-2016 (CL126)	current	5,000	4	4	6.25	64B65B PAM-16 128-DSQ	400	200	100	Cat 6	250	LAN
5GBASE-T1	802.3ch-2020 (CL149)	current	5,000	1	1	3.55̅	64B/65B PAM-4 RS-FEC	2,812.5	1,406.25	15	SPE	2,000	Automotive, IoT, M2M
10GBASE-T	802.3an-2006 (CL55)	current	10,000	4	4	6.25	64B65B PAM-16 128-DSQ	800	400	100	Cat 6A	500	LAN, Data center
10GBASE-T1	802.3ch-2020 (CL149)	current	10,000	1	1	3.55̅	64B/65B PAM-4 RS-FEC	5,625	2,812.5	15	SPE	4,000	Automotive, IoT, M2M
25GBASE-T	802.3bq-2016 (CL113)	current (not marketed)	25,000	4	4	6.25	PAM-16 RS-FEC (192, 186) LDPC	2,000	1,000	30	Cat 8	2,000	LAN, Data center
40GBASE-T	802.3bq-2016 (CL113)	current (not marketed)	40,000	4	4	6.25	PAM-16 RS-FEC (192, 186) LDPC	3,200	1,600	30	Cat 8	2,000	LAN, Data center
Name	Standard	Status	Speed (Mbit/s)	Pairs required	Lanes per direction	Data rate efficiency (bit/s/Hz)	Line code	Symbol rate per lane (MBd)	Bandwidth (MHz)	Max distance (m)	Cable	Cable rating (MHz)	Usage

== See also ==
- Classic Ethernet
- 25-pair color code
- Copper cable certification
- Ethernet extender
- Network isolator
- PHY-Level Collision Avoidance, used in 10BASE-T1
- Structured cabling
