= ISO/IEC 11801 =

International standard for electrical and optical cables

International standard ISO/IEC 11801 Information technology — Generic cabling for customer premises specifies general-purpose telecommunication cabling systems (structured cabling) that are suitable for a wide range of applications (analog and ISDN telephony, various data communication standards, building control systems, factory automation). It is published by ISO/IEC JTC 1/SC 25/WG 3 of the International Organization for Standardization (ISO) and the International Electrotechnical Commission (IEC). It covers both balanced copper cabling and optical fibre cabling.

The standard was designed for use within commercial premises that may consist of either a single building or of multiple buildings on a campus. It was optimized for premises that span up to 3 km, up to 1 km^{2} office space, with between 50 and 50,000 persons, but can also be applied for installations outside this range.

A major revision was released in November 2017, unifying requirements for commercial, home and industrial networks.

== Classes and categories ==
The standard defines several link/channel classes and cabling categories of twisted-pair copper interconnects, which differ in the maximum frequency for which a certain channel performance is required:

- Class A: Up to 100 kHz using Category 1 cable and connectors
- Class B: Up to 1 MHz using Category 2 cable and connectors
- Class C: Up to 16 MHz using Category 3 cable and connectors
- Class D: Up to 100 MHz using Category 5e cable and connectors
- Class E: Up to 250 MHz using Category 6 cable and connectors
- Class E_{A}: Up to 500 MHz using category 6A cable and connectors (Amendments 1 and 2 to ISO/IEC 11801, 2nd Ed.)
- Class F: Up to 600 MHz using Category 7 cable and connectors
- Class F_{A}: Up to 1 GHz (1000 MHz) using Category 7_{A} cable and connectors (Amendments 1 and 2 to ISO/IEC 11801, 2nd Ed.)
- Class BCT-B: Up to 1 GHz (1000 MHz) using with coaxial cabling for BCT applications. (ISO/IEC 11801-1, Edition 1.0 2017-11)
- Class I: Up to 2 GHz (2000 MHz) using Category 8.1 cable and connectors (ISO/IEC 11801-1, Edition 1.0 2017-11)
- Class II: Up to 2 GHz (2000 MHz) using Category 8.2 cable and connectors (ISO/IEC 11801-1, Edition 1.0 2017-11)

The standard link impedance is 100 Ω. (The older 1995 version of the standard also permitted 120 Ω and 150 Ω in Classes A−C, but this was removed from the 2002 edition.)

The standard defines several classes of optical fiber interconnect:

- OM1*: Multimode, 62.5 μm core; minimum modal bandwidth of 200 MHz·km at 850 nm
- OM2*: Multimode, 50 μm core; minimum modal bandwidth of 500 MHz·km at 850 nm
- OM3: Multimode, 50 μm core; minimum modal bandwidth of 2000 MHz·km at 850 nm
- OM4: Multimode, 50 μm core; minimum modal bandwidth of 4700 MHz·km at 850 nm
- OM5: Multimode, 50 μm core; minimum modal bandwidth of 4700 MHz·km at 850 nm and 2470 MHz·km at 953 nm
- OS1*: Single-mode, maximum attenuation 1 dB/km at 1310 and 1550 nm
- OS1a: Single-mode, maximum attenuation 1 dB/km at 1310, 1383, and 1550 nm
- OS2: Single-mode, maximum attenuation 0.4 dB/km at 1310, 1383, and 1550 nm

*Grandfathered

=== OM5 ===
OM5 fiber is designed for wideband applications using SWDM multiplexing of 4–16 carriers (40G=4λ×10G, 100G=4λ×25G, 400G=4×4λ×25G) in the 850–953 nm range.

=== Category 7 ===
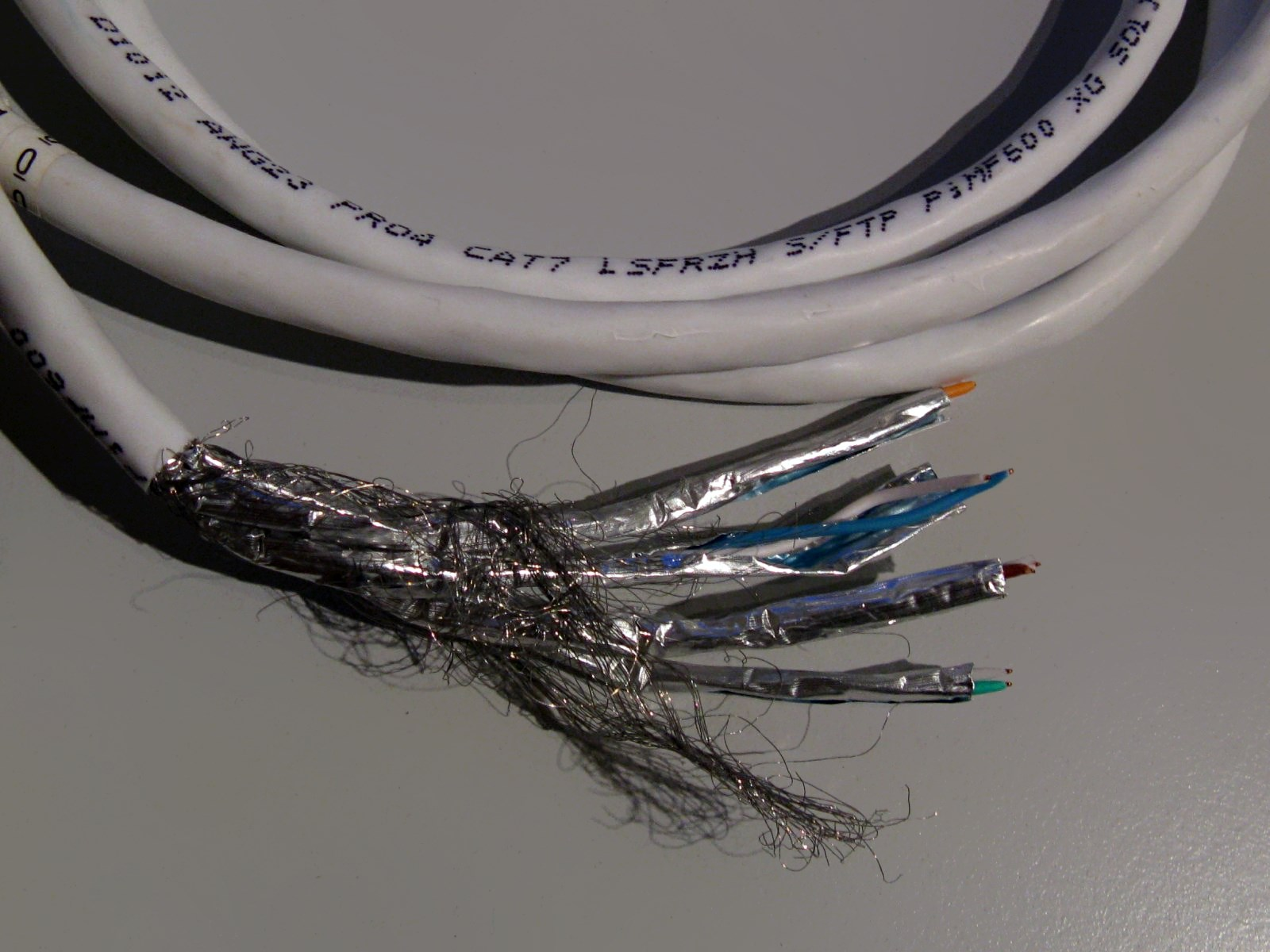
Category 7 S/FTP cable

Class F channel and Category 7 cable are backward compatible with Class D/Category 5e and Class E/Category 6. Class F features even stricter specifications for crosstalk and system noise than Class E. To achieve this, shielding was added for individual wire pairs and the cable as a whole. Unshielded cables rely on the quality of the twists to protect from EMI. This involves a tight twist and carefully controlled design. Cables with individual shielding per pair such as Category 7 rely mostly on the shield and therefore have pairs with longer twists.

The Category 7 cable standard was ratified in 2002, and primarily introduced to support 10 gigabit Ethernet over 100 m of copper cabling. Like the earlier standards, it contains four twisted copper wire pairs rated for transmission frequencies of up to 600 MHz.

However, in 2006, Category 6_{A} was ratified for Ethernet to allow 10 Gbit/s while still using the conventional 8P8C connector. Care is required to avoid signal degradation by mixing cable and connectors not designed for that use, however similar. Most manufacturers of active equipment and network cards have chosen to support the 8P8C for their 10 gigabit Ethernet products on copper and not GG45, ARJ45, or TERA connectors as Class F would have originally called for. Therefore, the Category 6 specification was revised to Category 6_{A} to permit this use; products therefore require a Class E_{A} channel (ie, Cat 6_{A}).

As of 2019, some equipment has been introduced which has connectors supporting the Class F (Category 7) channel.

Note, however, that Category 7 is not recognized by the TIA/EIA.

=== Category 7_{A} ===
Class F_{A} (Class F Augmented) channels and Category 7_{A} cables, introduced by ISO 11801 Edition 2 Amendment 2 (2010), are defined at frequencies up to 1000 MHz.

The intent of the Class F_{A} was to possibly support the future 40 gigabit Ethernet: 40GBASE-T. Simulation results have shown that 40 gigabit Ethernet may be possible at 50 meters and 100 gigabit Ethernet at 15 meters. In 2007, researchers at Pennsylvania State University predicted that either 32 nm or 22 nm circuits would allow for 100 gigabit Ethernet at 100 meters.

However, in 2016, the IEEE 802.3bq working group ratified the amendment 3 which defines 25GBASE-T and 40GBASE-T on Category 8 cabling specified to 2000 MHz. The Class F_{A} therefore does not support 40G Ethernet.

As of 2025, there is no equipment that has connectors supporting the Class F_{A} (Category 7_{A}) channel.

Category 7_{A} is not recognized in TIA/EIA.

=== Category 8 ===
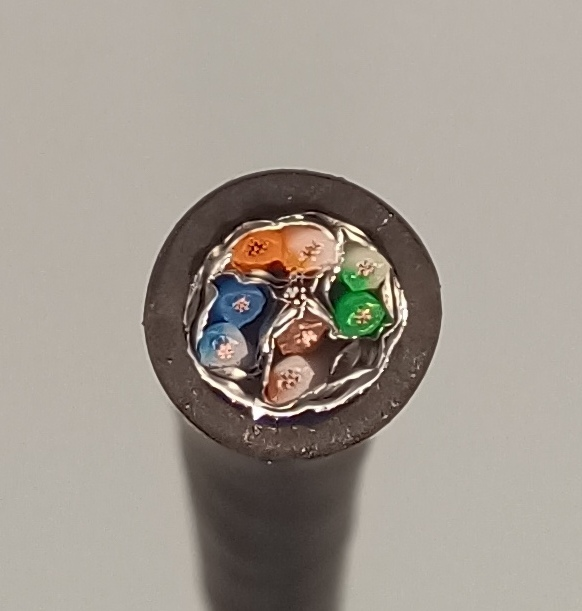
Cross-section of a Category 8 F/FTP cable

Category 8 was ratified by the TR43 working group under ANSI/TIA 568-C.2-1. It is defined up to 2000 MHz and only for distances up to 30 m or 36 m, depending on the patch cords used.

ISO/IEC JTC 1/SC 25/WG 3 developed the equivalent standard ISO/IEC 11801-1:2017/COR 1:2018, with two options:

- Class I channel (Category 8.1 cable): minimum cable design U/FTP or F/UTP, fully backward compatible and interoperable with Class E_{A} (Category 6_{A}) using 8P8C connector;
- Class II channel (Category 8.2 cable): F/FTP or S/FTP minimum, interoperable with Class F_{A} (Category 7_{A}) using TERA or GG45 connectors.

== Abbreviations for twisted pairs ==
Annex E, Acronyms for balanced cables, provides a system to specify the exact construction for both unshielded and shielded balanced twisted pair cables. It uses three letters—U for unshielded, S for braided shielding, and F for foil shielding—to form a two-part abbreviation in the form of xx/xTP, where the first part specifies the type of overall cable shielding, and the second part specifies shielding for individual cable elements.

Common cable types include U/UTP (unshielded cable); U/FTP (individual pair shielding without the overall screen); F/UTP, S/UTP, or SF/UTP (overall screen without individual shielding); and F/FTP, S/FTP, or SF/FTP (overall screen with individual foil shielding).

== 2017 edition ==
In November 2017, a new edition was released by ISO/IEC JTC 1/SC 25 "Interconnection of information technology equipment" subcommittee. It is a major revision of the standard which has unified several prior standards for commercial, home, and industrial networks, as well as data centers, and defines requirements for generic cabling and distributed building networks.

The new series of standards replaces the former 11801 standard and includes six parts:

ISO/IEC Standard	Title	Replaces	Description
ISO/IEC 11801-1	Part 1: General requirements	ISO/IEC 11801	Generic cabling requirements for twisted-pair and optical fiber cables
ISO/IEC 11801-2	Part 2: Office premises	ISO/IEC 11801	Cabling for commercial (enterprise) buildings
ISO/IEC 11801-3	Part 3: Industrial premises	ISO/IEC 24702	Cabling for industrial buildings, with applications including automation, process control, and monitoring
ISO/IEC 11801-4	Part 4: Single-tenant homes	ISO/IEC 15018	Cabling for residential buildings, including 1200 MHz links for CATV/SATV applications
ISO/IEC 11801-5	Part 5: Data centers	ISO/IEC 24764	Cabling for high-performance networks used by data centers
ISO/IEC 11801-6	Part 6: Distributed building services	—	Cabling for distributed wireless networks for building automation and IOT devices

== Versions ==
- ISO/IEC 11801:1995 (Ed. 1)
- ISO/IEC 11801:2000 (Ed. 1.1) – Edition 1, Amendment 1
- ISO/IEC 11801:2002 (Ed. 2)
- ISO/IEC 11801:2008 (Ed. 2.1) – Edition 2, Amendment 1
- ISO/IEC 11801:2010 (Ed. 2.2) – Edition 2, Amendment 2
- ISO/IEC 11801-1:2017, -1:2017/Cor 1:2018, -2:2017, -3:2017, -3:2017/Amd 1:2021, -3:2017/Cor 1:2018, -4:2017, -4:2017/Cor 1:2018, -5:2017, -5:2017/Cor 1:2018, -6:2017, -6:2017/Cor 1:2018 (As of September 2023, this set is current.)

== See also ==
- Ethernet over twisted pair
