= GG45 =

Connector interface for twisted pair cabling

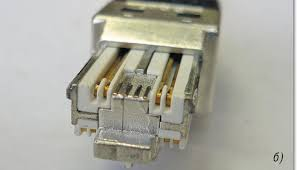
GG45 Connector

GG45 (GigaGate 45) and ARJ45 (Augmented RJ45) are two related connectors for Category 7, Category 7_{A}, and Category 8 telecommunication cabling. The GG45 interface and related implementations are developed and sold by Nexans S.A., while the ARJ45 interface and related implementations are developed and sold by Bel Fuse Inc. The electrical performance of each is compliant with IEC 61076-3-110, as published by the International Electrotechnical Commission. Furthermore, the ARJ45 connector meets the mechanical dimensions specified in IEC 61076-3-110.

== Details ==
The GG45 and ARJ45 connectors operate in the frequency band between 600 MHz and 5 GHz with shielded twisted pair and twinax cables. To reduce crosstalk, two of the four pairs have been moved so that each pair occupies one corner.

GG45 is a variant of ARJ45 that allows for cables terminated with male 8P8C (AKA RJ45) connectors to be plugged into GG45 jacks. However, GG45 cables cannot plug into 8P8C jacks as a protrusion on the socket is designed to activate a switch on the jack for the alternative contact positions.

Combined with an internal system of Faraday cages, the GG45 interface therefore has plenty of headroom, plus the ability to migrate to higher speed service by upgrading to Category 7A patch cords that activate the switch in the jack.

There are two main variants of GG45/ARJ45:

- GG45 or ARJ45 HD is the full connector with 12 contacts, providing a Category 6 cable interface (100/250 MHz) for older devices as well as the new interface.
- ARJ45 HS is the version without the Cat-6–compatible contacts, for a total of 8 contacts.

   1 2 3 4 5 6 7 8 
|‾‾█‾█‾█‾█‾█‾█‾█‾█‾‾|     Pinout of GG45 and ARJ45 HD sockets. The protrusion ▒▒▒
|                   |     activates a switch, redirecting the 3-6 and 4-5 pairs to
|                   |     the corners on a GG45 jack (3′ and 6′, and 4′ and 5′).
|_█_█____▒▒▒____█_█_|
  3′6′  |   |   4′5′      ARJ45 HS omits the Cat-6–compatible 3-6 and 4-5 pairs.
         |_|          

== See also ==
- TERA
