= TERA =

Shielded twisted pair connector

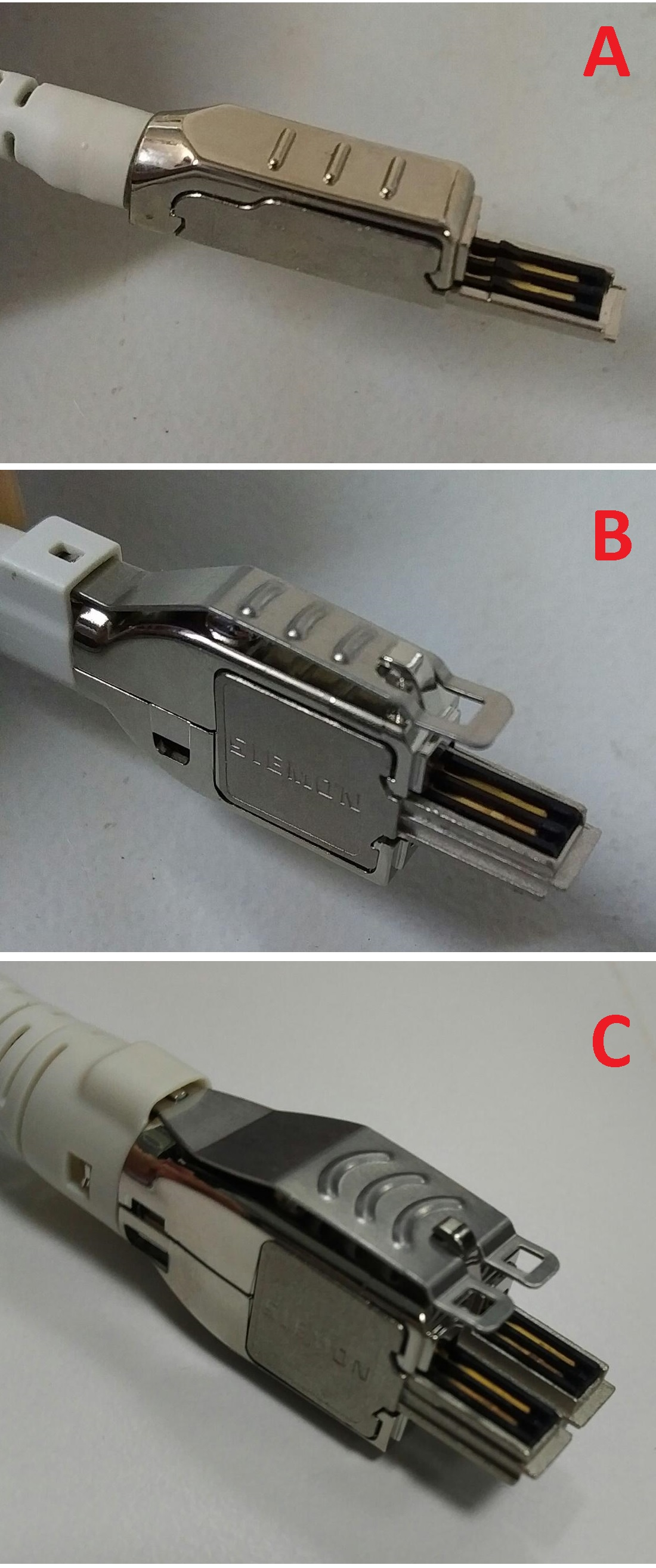
TERA connector allows splitting the link through different patch cords with one, two, and four pairs.

TERA is a shielded twisted pair connector for use with Category 7 twisted-pair data cables, developed by The Siemon Company and standardised in 2003 by the International Electrotechnical Commission (IEC) with the reference IEC 61076–3–104.

== Connector ==
The 2006 revision of the standard extended the characterised performance up to 1000 MHz. The connector has a different footprint from the more common 8P8C connector.

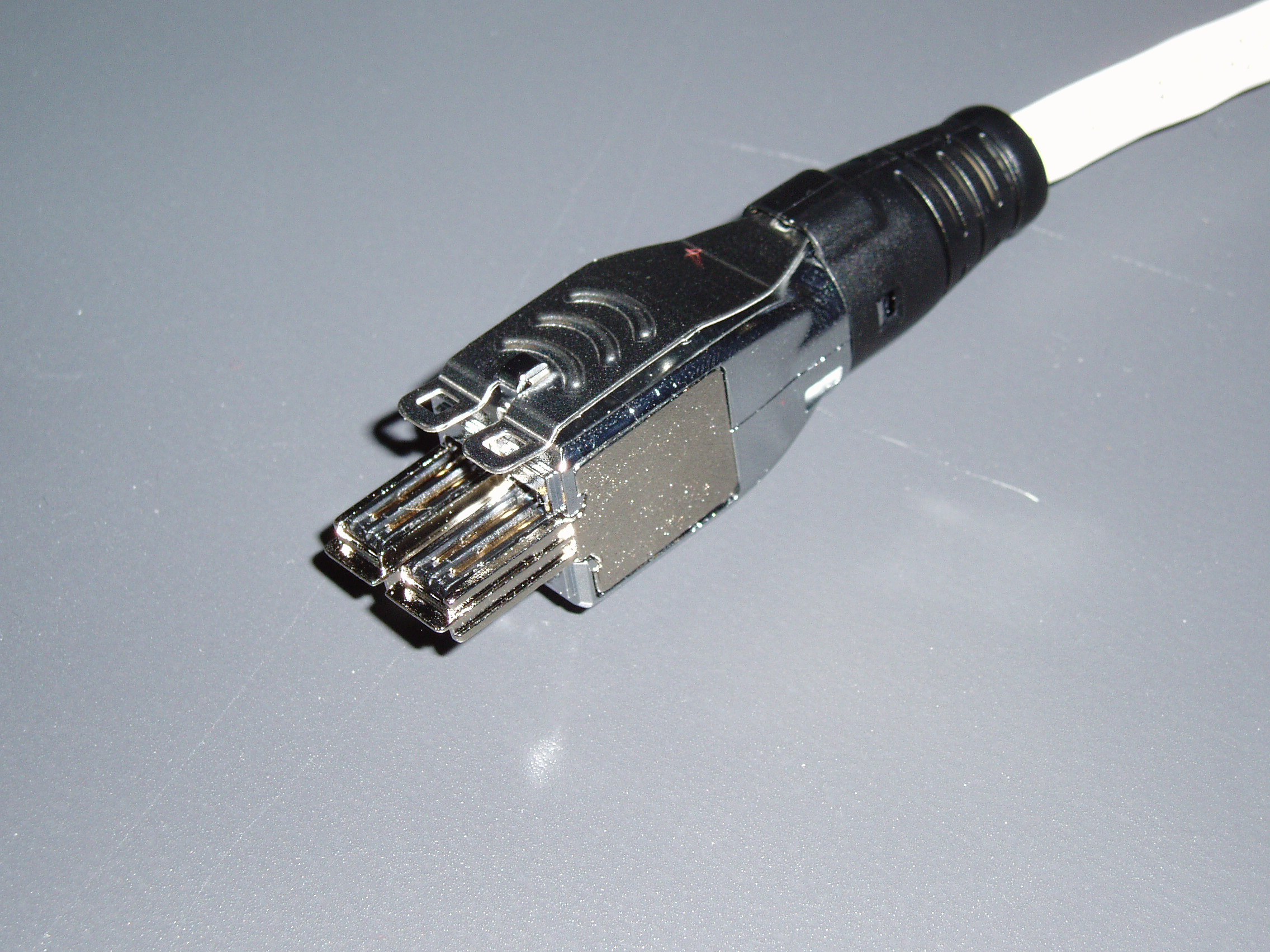
TERA connector

TERA is also a useful interface for broadcast communications technology (BCT). This connector allows for cable sharing, permitting users to integrate video, voice and data services over a single cabling link.

== See also ==
- GG45 or ARJ45, a connector for high-speed Category 7 cable
