= Category 6 cable =

Standardized data communications cable

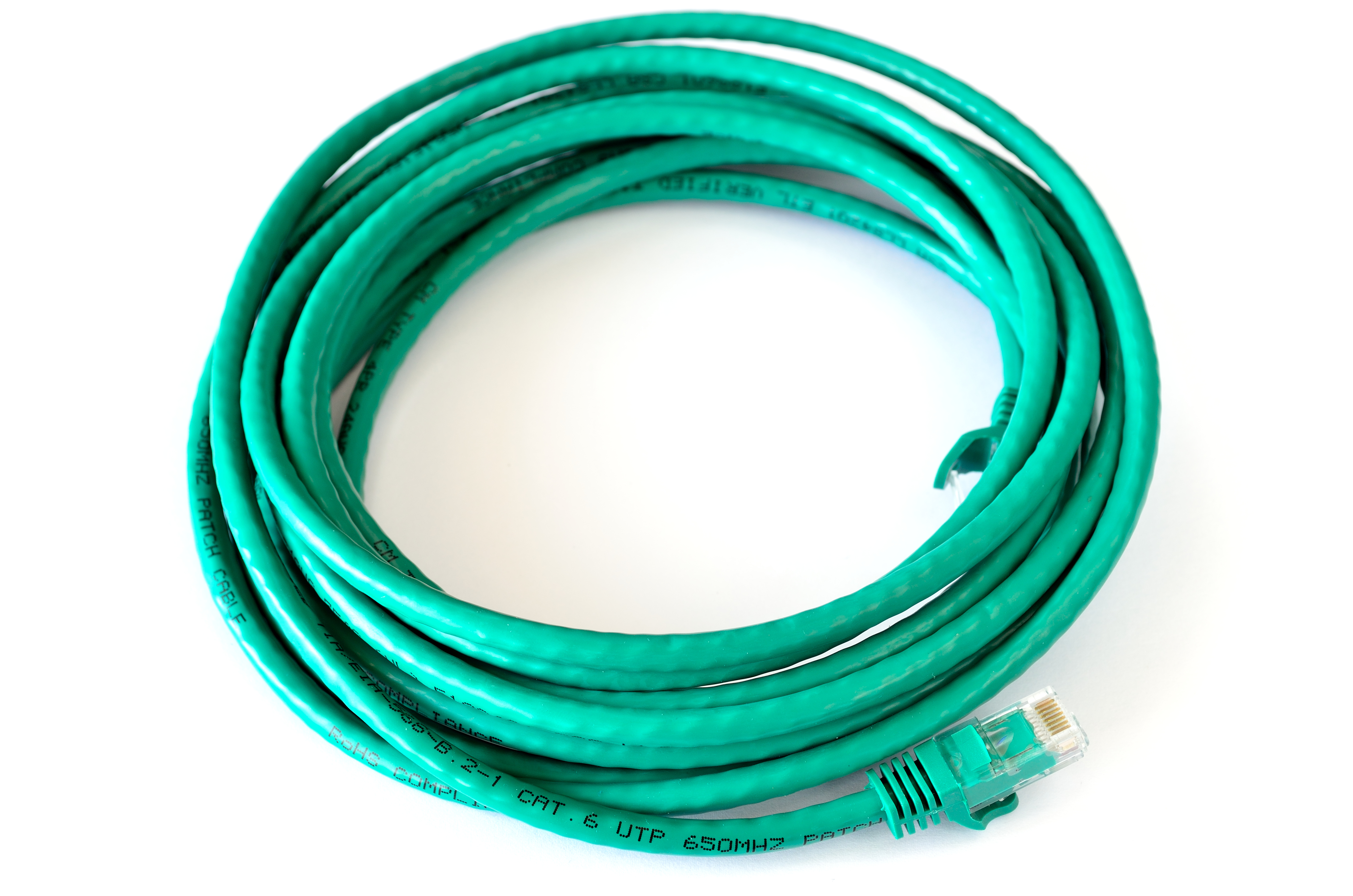
A Cat 6 patch cable, terminated with 8P8C modular connectors

Category 6 cable (Cat 6) is a standardized twisted pair cable for Ethernet and other network physical layers that is backward compatible with the Category 5/5e and Category 3 cable standards.

Cat 6 must meet more stringent specifications for crosstalk and system noise than Cat 5 and Cat 5e. The cable standard specifies performance of up to 250 MHz, compared to 100 MHz for Cat 5 and Cat 5e.

Whereas Category 6 cable has a reduced maximum length of 55 metres (180 ft) when used for 10GBASE-T, Category 6A cable is specified for 500 MHz and has improved alien crosstalk characteristics, allowing 10GBASE-T to be run for the same 100-metre (330 ft) maximum distance as previous Ethernet over twisted pair variants.

== History ==
Cat 6, an unshielded twisted-pair (UTP) design, emerged as an advancement of the UTP Cat 5e and was formalised in 2001. The design of Cat 6 required more stringent precision in manufacturing, which enabled reduced noise and crosstalk, thereby improving performance. The Telecommunications Industry Association (TIA) published Cat 6 in June 2002.

== Description ==
TIA/EIA-568-B.1-2001 T568A Wiring
Pin	Pair	Wire	Color
1	3	1	white/green
2	3	2	green
3	2	1	white/orange
4	1	2	blue
5	1	1	white/blue
6	2	2	orange
7	4	1	white/brown
8	4	2	brown

TIA/EIA-568-B.1-2001 T568B Wiring
Pin	Pair	Wire	Color
1	2	1	white/orange
2	2	2	orange
3	3	1	white/green
4	1	2	blue
5	1	1	white/blue
6	3	2	green
7	4	1	white/brown
8	4	2	brown

Cat 6 cable can be identified by the printing on the side of the cable sheath. Cable types, connector types and cabling topologies are defined by ANSI/TIA-568.

Cat 6 patch cables are normally terminated in 8P8C modular connectors, using either T568A or T568B pin assignments; performance is comparable provided both ends of a cable are terminated identically.

If Cat-6–rated patch cables, jacks and connectors are not used with Cat 6 wiring, overall performance is degraded and may not meet Cat 6 performance specifications.

The Cat 6 specification requires conductors to be pure copper. The industry has seen a rise in non-compliant or counterfeit cables, especially of the copper-clad aluminium wire (CCA) variety. This has exposed the manufacturers or installers of such fake cable to legal liabilities. The diameter of the wires in Cat 6 cables ranges from 22 to 26 AWG.

== Category 6A ==
The standard for Category 6A (augmented Category 6) is ANSI/TIA-568.2-D (replaces 568-C.2), defined by TIA for enhanced performance standards for twisted pair cable systems. It was defined in 2009. Cat 6A performance is defined for frequencies up to 500 MHz—twice that of Cat 6. Cat 6A also has an improved alien crosstalk specification as compared to Cat 6, which picks up high levels of alien noise at high frequencies.

The global cabling standard ISO/IEC 11801 has been extended by the addition of amendment 2. This amendment defines new specifications for Cat 6A components and Class E_{A} permanent links. These new global Cat 6A/Class E_{A} specifications require a new generation of connecting hardware offering far superior performance compared to the existing products that are based on the American TIA standard. The most important point is a performance difference between ISO/IEC and EIA/TIA component specifications for the NEXT transmission parameter. At a frequency of 500 MHz, an ISO/IEC Cat 6A connector performs 3 dB better than a Cat 6A connector that conforms with the EIA/TIA specification (3 dB equals 50% reduction of near-end crosstalk noise signal power; see half-power point).

Confusion therefore arises because of the naming conventions and performance benchmarks laid down by the International ISO/IEC and American TIA/EIA standards, which in turn are different from the regional European standard, EN 50173–1. In general, the ISO standard for Cat 6A is the most stringent, followed by the European standard, and the American one (1 on 1 matching capability).

== Category 6e ==
Cat 6e is not a recognized standard and has no agreed meaning. After the ratification of Category 6, manufacturers began offering cabling systems and solutions labeled as Category 6e. This is a marketing claim from manufacturers and typically refers to a claim of headroom performance above the defined TIA Category 6 standard. The name resembles the name of the (legitimate) Category 5e standard.

== Maximum length ==
When used for 10/100/1000BASE-T, the maximum allowed length of a Cat 6 cable is 100 meters (328 ft). This consists of 90 meters (295 ft) permanent link, which is typically solid horizontal cabling between two connectors, often the patch panel and the wall jack, plus 10 meters (33 ft) total of stranded patch cordage. Manufacturers have begun offering claims of supporting distances beyond 100 meters (328 ft) which would fall outside of the TIA 568–2.D standard.

== Installation requirements ==
Category 6 and 6A cable must be properly installed and terminated to meet specifications. The cable must not be kinked or bent too tightly; the bend radius should be larger than four times the outer diameter of the cable. The wire pairs must not be untwisted, and the outer jacket must not be stripped back more than 13 mm (0.51 in).

Cable shielding may be required in order to avoid data corruption in high electromagnetic interference (EMI) environments. Shielding is typically maintained from one cable end to the other using a drain wire that runs through the cable alongside the twisted pairs. The shield's electrical connection to the chassis on each end is made through the jacks. The requirement for ground connections at both cable ends creates the possibility of creating a ground loop. This undesirable situation may compel currents to flow in the network cable shield and these currents may, in turn, induce detrimental noise in the signal being carried by the cable.
