= PHY-Level Collision Avoidance =

IEEE standard

PHY-Level Collision Avoidance (PLCA) is a component of the Ethernet reconciliation sublayer (between the PHY and the MAC) defined within IEEE 802.3 clause 148. The purpose of PLCA is to avoid the shared medium collisions and associated retransmission overhead. PLCA is used in 802.3cg (10BASE-T1S), which focuses on bringing Ethernet connectivity to short-haul embedded internet of things and low throughput, noise-tolerant, industrial deployment use cases.

In order for a multidrop 10BASE-T1S standard to successfully compete with CAN XL, some kind of arbitration was necessary. The linear arbitration scheme of PLCA somewhat resembles that of the Byteflight, but PLCA was designed from scratch to accommodate the existing shared medium Ethernet MACs with their busy sensing mechanisms.

== Operation ==
10BASE-T1S Physical Level Collision Avoidance (PLCA) operation. The picture contains two oscilloscope-like traces with beacons in green and data frame in yellow. The top trace depicts the absence of traffic; beacons are sent by the coordinator at fixed intervals. The bottom trace shows the situation when the node with an ID 11 uses its transmission opportunity (TO, TOs are marked using the grid scale). The data frame expands the regular interval between two beacons.

Under a PLCA scheme all nodes are assigned unique sequential numbers (IDs) in the range from 0 to N. Zero ID corresponds to a special "coordinator" node that during the idle intervals transmits the synchronization beacon (a special heartbeat frame). After the beacon (within PLCA cycle) each node gets its transmission opportunity (TO). Each opportunity interval is very short (typically 20 bits), so overhead for the nodes that do not have anything to transmit is low. If the PLCA circuitry discovers that the node's TO cannot be used (the other node with a lower ID have started its transmission and the media is busy at the beginning of the TO for this node), it asserts the "local collision" input of the MAC thus delaying the transmission. The condition is cleared once the node gets its TO. A standard MAC reacts to the local collision with a backoff, however, since this is the first and only backoff for this frame, the backoff interval is equal to the smallest possible frame - and the backoff timer will definitely expire by the time the TO is granted, so there is no additional loss of performance.

== See also ==
- Internet of things (IOT)

== Sources ==
- Cena, Gianluca; Scanzio, Stefano; Valenzano, Adriano (2023-04-26). Composite CAN XL-Ethernet Networks for Next-Gen Automotive and Automation Systems. 2023 IEEE 19th International Conference on Factory Communication Systems (WFCS). IEEE. arXiv:2306.09498. doi:10.1109/wfcs57264.2023.10144116.
- Beruto, Piergiorgio; Orzelli, Antonio (2018). 802.3cg draft 2.0 PLCA (Clause 148) Overview (PDF). San Diego, CA: IEEE 802.3 Plenary Meeting.
