= The Siemon Company =

American telecommunications company

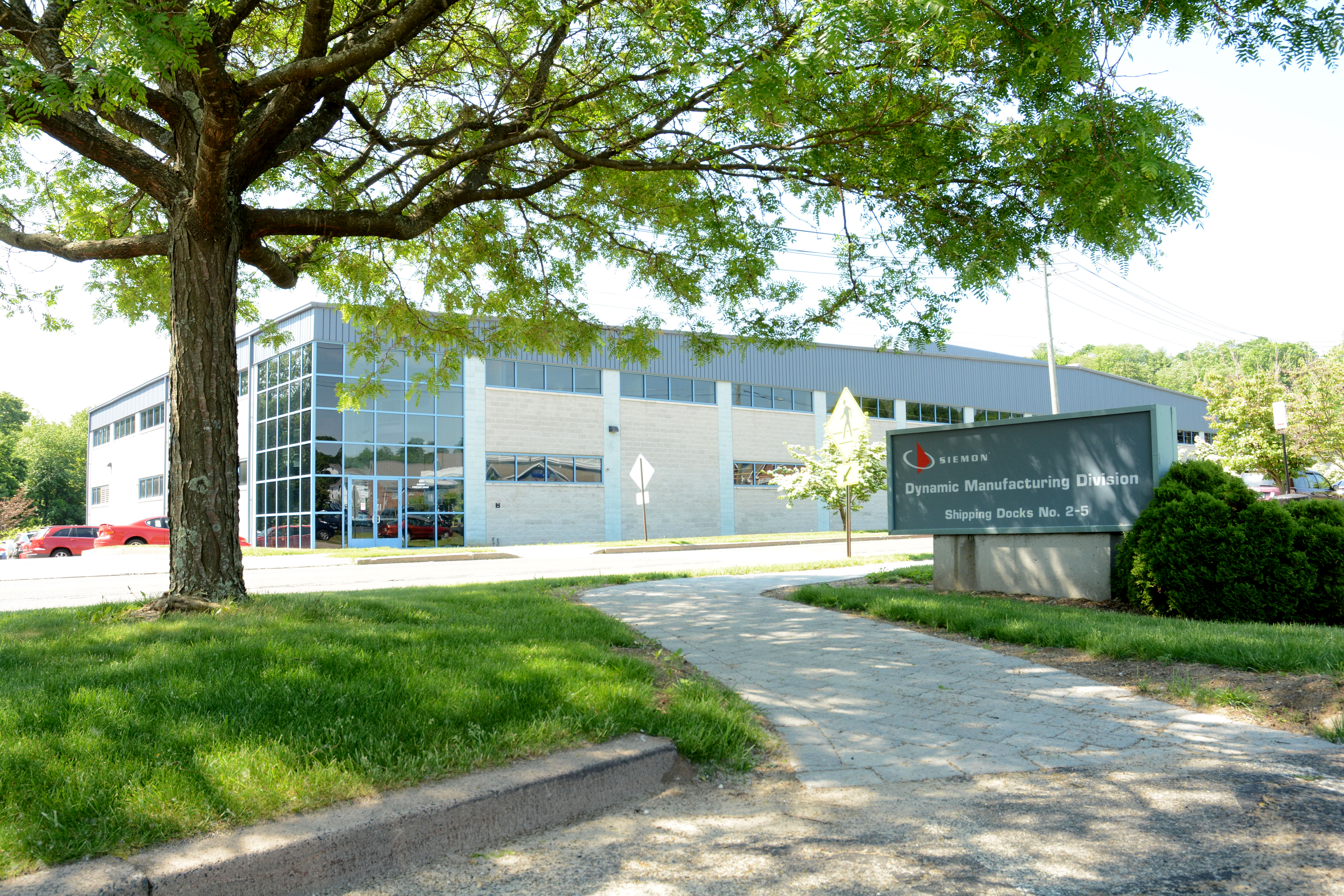
- Siemon Company Headquarters, 2016
- Industry: Telecommunications
- Founded: 1903
- Founder: Carl F. Siemon
- Headquarters: Watertown, CT, United States
- Website: www.siemon.com

The Siemon Company is an American telecommunications company founded in 1903 that provides IT infrastructure hardware and services for data centers, local area networks (LANs) and intelligent buildings.

The Siemon Company offers copper and optical fiber cabling systems, cabinets, racks, cable management, data center power and cooling systems.

== History ==
The Siemon Company was founded in Bridgeport, Connecticut, in 1903.

In 1906, The Siemon Company began manufacturing of a three-pole connecting block for AT&T. AT&T's three-pole connecting blocks were ceramic and fragile. Carl Siemon manufactured a durable plastic version identical to the AT&T block and became a supplier for AT&T and the later "Baby Bells."

In 1923, the company acquired the Bell Record Company and began manufacturing records.

In 1954, the company relocated from its original home in Bridgeport, Connecticut to its current headquarters in Watertown, Connecticut.

During the 1960s, The Siemon Company acquired the Dynamic Tool & Manufacturing Company and expanded operations to Canada and Puerto Rico. Siemon began shipping its 66 connecting blocks to other customers, and the 66 block quickly became the standard for installing new telephone systems.

During the 1980s, the Siemon Company began focusing on the computer networking industry, producing network jacks, patch panels, tools, and testers.

In 1999, The Global Project Services division of Siemon is launched to provide global cabling services.

In 2016, Siemon acquires Gigaduct Fiber Containment System for data centers.

== Divisions ==
=== Siemon Interconnect Solutions ===
Siemon Interconnect Solutions (SIS) provides network infrastructure solutions to OEMs, manufacturers, value-added resellers, and system integrators.

=== Siemon Global Project Services ===
Siemon Global Project Services (GPS) is a services team that works on multi-site cabling projects for end users.
