= Category 2 cable =

Unshielded twisted pair cabling for telephone and data communications

Category 2 cable, also known as Cat 2, is a grade of unshielded twisted pair cabling designed for telephone and data communications. The maximum frequency suitable for transmission over Cat 2 cable is 4 MHz, and the maximum bandwidth is 4 Mbit/s. Cat 2 cable contains 4 pairs of wires, or 8 wires total.

Official TIA/EIA-568 standards have only been established for cables of Cat 3 ratings or above. Though not an official category standard established by TIA/EIA, Category 2 has become the de facto name given to Level 2 cables originally defined by Anixter International, the distributor.

Anixter Level 2 cable was frequently used on ARCnet and 4 Mbit/s Token Ring networks, it is also used in telephone networks but it is no longer commonly used.
