= Twisted pair =

Type of wiring used for communications

25-pair color code chart

Twisted pair cabling is a type of communications cable in which two conductors of a single circuit are twisted together for the purposes of improving electromagnetic compatibility. Compared to a single conductor or an untwisted balanced pair, a twisted pair reduces electromagnetic radiation from the pair and crosstalk between neighboring pairs and improves rejection of external electromagnetic interference. It was invented by Alexander Graham Bell.

For additional noise immunity, twisted-pair cabling may be shielded. Cable with shielding is known as shielded twisted pair (STP) and without as unshielded twisted pair (UTP).

== Description ==
A twisted pair can be used as a balanced line, which as part of a balanced circuit can greatly reduce the effect of noise currents induced on the line by coupling of electric or magnetic fields. The idea is that the currents induced in each of the two wires are very nearly equal. The twisting ensures that the two wires are on average the same distance from the interfering source and are affected equally. The noise thus produces a common-mode signal which can be canceled at the receiver by detecting the difference signal only, the latter being the wanted signal.

Common-mode rejection starts to fail on untwisted wires when the noise source is close to the signal wires; the closer wire will couple with the noise more strongly and the receiver will be unable to eliminate it. This problem is especially apparent in telecommunication cables where pairs in the same cable lie next to each other for many miles. Twisting the pairs counters this effect as on each half twist the wire nearest to the noise source is exchanged. Provided the interfering source remains uniform, or nearly so, over the distance of a single twist, the induced noise will remain common mode.

The twist rate (also called pitch of the twist, usually defined in twists per meter) makes up part of the specification for a given type of cable. When nearby pairs have equal twist rates, the same conductors of the different pairs may repeatedly lie next to each other, partially undoing the benefits of twisting. For this reason, it is commonly specified that, at least for cables containing small numbers of pairs, the twist rates must differ.

In contrast to shielded or foiled twisted pair (typically S/FTP or F/UTP cable shielding), UTP cable is not surrounded by any shielding. UTP is the primary wire type for telephone usage and is very common for computer networking.

== History ==
Wire transposition on top of pole

The earliest telephones used telegraph lines, which were single-wire earth return circuits. In the 1880s electric trams were installed in many cities, which induced noise into these circuits. In some countries, the tram companies were held responsible for disruption to existing telegraph lines and had to pay for remedial work. (Note: In Cape Town for instance, a balancing conductor was installed from the telegraph office through the streets and six miles out to sea to fix interference to the submarine telegraph cable from Luanda.) For new installations, however, it was necessary to protect against existing trams from the outset. Interference on telephone lines is even more disruptive than it is on telegraph lines. Telephone companies converted to balanced circuits, which had the incidental benefit of reducing attenuation, hence increasing range.

As electrical power distribution became more commonplace, this measure proved inadequate. Two wires, strung on either side of cross bars on utility poles, shared the route with electrical power lines. Within a few years, the growing use of electricity again brought an increase of interference, so engineers devised a method called wire transposition, to cancel out the interference.

In wire transposition, the wires exchange position every several poles. In this way, the two wires would receive similar EMI from power lines. This represented an early implementation of twisting, with a twist rate of about four twists per kilometer, or six per mile. Such open-wire balanced lines with periodic transpositions still survive today in some rural areas.

Twisted-pair cabling was invented by Alexander Graham Bell in 1881. By 1900, the entire American telephone network was either twisted pair or open wire with transposition to guard against interference. Today, most of the twisted pairs in the world are outdoor landlines, owned and maintained by telephone companies, used for voice service.

== Unshielded twisted pair ==
Cross-section of cable with four unshielded twisted pairs

Unshielded twisted pair (UTP) cables are found in many Ethernet networks and telephone systems. For indoor telephone applications, UTP is often grouped into sets of 25 pairs according to a standard 25-pair color code originally developed by AT&T. A typical subset of these colors (white/blue, blue/white, white/orange, orange/white) shows up in most UTP cables. The cables are typically made with copper wires measured at 22 or 24 American Wire Gauge (AWG), with the colored insulation typically made from an insulator such as polyethylene or FEP and the total package covered in a polyethylene jacket.

For urban outdoor telephone cables containing hundreds or thousands of pairs, the cable is divided into small but identical bundles. Each bundle consists of twisted pairs that have different twist rates, as pairs having the same twist rate within the cable can still experience some degree of crosstalk. The bundles are in turn twisted together to make up the cable.

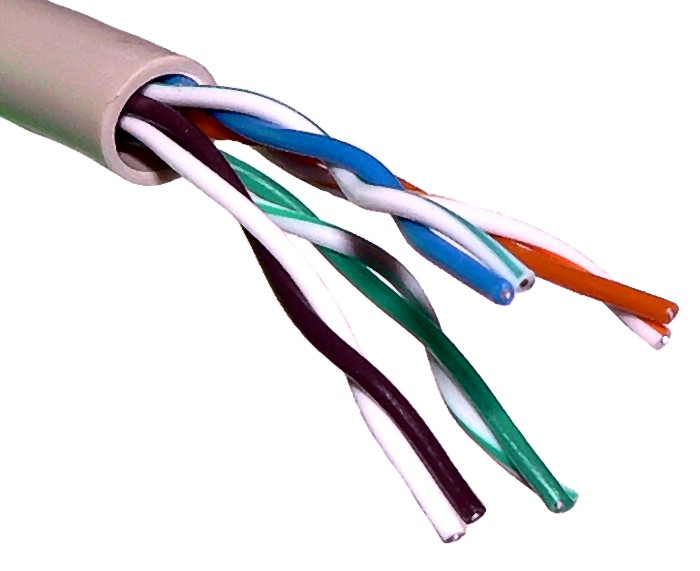
Unshielded twisted pair cable with different twist rates

UTP is also the most common cable used in computer networking. Modern Ethernet, the most common data networking standard, can use UTP cables, with increasing data rates requiring higher specification variants of the UTP cable. Twisted-pair cabling is often used in data networks for short and medium-length connections because of its relatively lower costs compared to optical fiber and coaxial cable.

As UTP cable bandwidth has improved to match the baseband of television signals, UTP is now used in some video applications, primarily in security cameras. As UTP is a balanced transmission line, a balun is needed to connect to unbalanced equipment, for example any using BNC connectors and designed for coaxial cable.

== Cable shielding ==
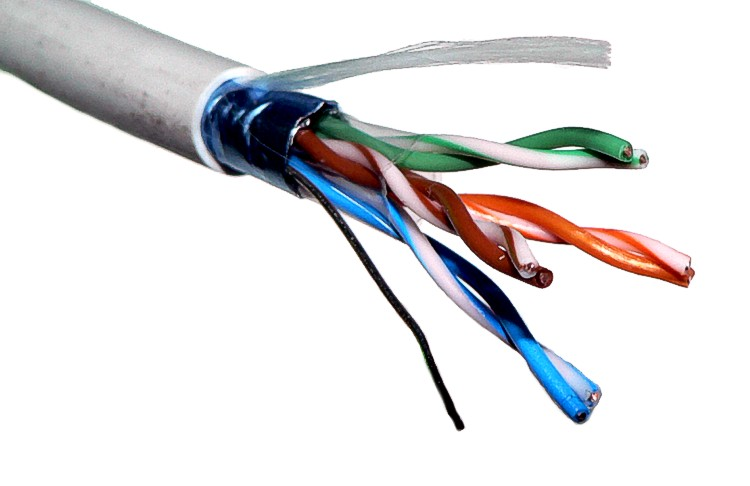
F/UTP cable

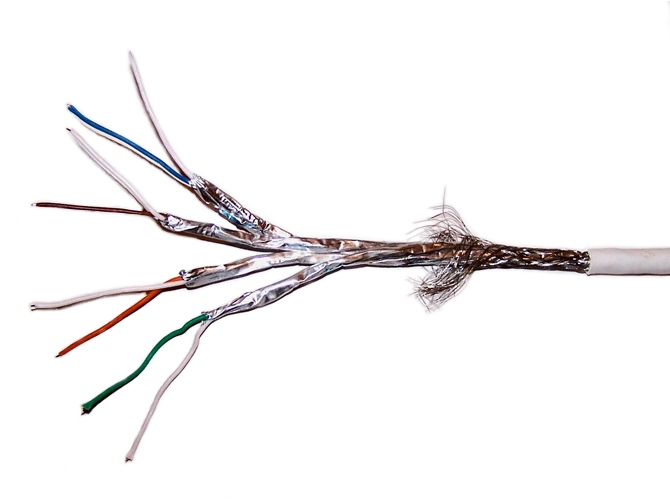
S/FTP cable

Twisted pair cables may incorporate shielding in an attempt to prevent electromagnetic interference. Shielding provides an electrically conductive barrier to attenuate electromagnetic waves external to the shield. The shield also provides a conduction path by which induced currents can be circulated and returned to the source via a ground reference connection. Such shielding can be applied to individual pairs or to a collection of pairs. Shielding may be foil or braided wire.

When shielding is applied to a collection of pairs, it is usually referred to as screening, but usage among vendors and authors in applying such words as screening, shielding, and STP (shielded twisted pair) can be subject to variability.

ISO/IEC 11801:2002 (Annex E) attempts to internationally standardize the various shielding designations for twisted pair (TP) cables using an explicit two-part abbreviation in the form of x/xTP, where the first x indicates the shielding for the overall cable and the second x indicates the shielding for individual pairs or quads, where each x can be:

- U for unshielded,
- S for braided shielding (in outer layer only), and/or
- F for foil shielding.

F/UTP, U/FTP and F/FTP are used in Cat 6A cables

Shielded Cat 5e, Cat 6/6A, and Cat 8/8.1 cables typically have F/UTP construction, while shielded Cat 7/7_{A} and Cat 8.2 cables use S/FTP construction.

Because the shielding is conductive, it may also serve as a path to ground. A foil-shielded, twisted pair cable may have an integrally incorporated grounding wire called a drain wire which makes electrical contact with the shield. The purpose of the drain wire is for easy connection to terminals which are usually designed for connection of round wires.

Common shield construction types include:

- Individual shield (U/FTP): Individual shielding with aluminum foil for each twisted pair or quad. Common names: pair in metal foil (PiMF), shielded twisted pair, screened twisted pair, shielded pair. This type of shielding helps prevent EMI from entering or exiting individual pairs and also protects neighboring pairs from crosstalk.
- Overall shield (F/UTP, S/UTP, and SF/UTP): Overall foil, braided shield or braiding with foil across all of the pairs within the 100 ohm twisted pair cable. Common names: foiled twisted pair, shielded twisted pair, screened twisted pair. This type of shielding helps prevent EMI from entering or exiting the cable.
- Individual and overall shield (F/FTP, S/FTP, and SF/FTP): Individual shielding using foils for every twisted pair in a cable, and also an outer foil or braided shielding. Common names: fully shielded twisted pair, screened foiled twisted pair, shielded foiled twisted pair, screened shielded twisted pair, shielded screened twisted pair. This type of shielding helps prevent EMI from entering or exiting the cable and also protects neighboring pairs from crosstalk.

An early example of shielded twisted-pair was IBM STP-A, which is a two-pair 150 ohm S/FTP cable defined in 1985 by the IBM Cabling System specifications, and used with Token Ring or FDDI networks.

Common industry nomenclature for cable construction types
Industry abbreviations	ISO/IEC 11801 designation (Note: The code before the slash designates the shielding for the cable itself, while the code after the slash determines the shielding for the individual pairs: U – unshielded F – foil shielding S – screened shielding (outer layer only) TP – twisted pair TQ – twisted pair, individual shielding in quads)	Cable shielding	Pair shielding	Illustration
UTP, TP	U/UTP	None	None	U/UTP twisted pair cable shielding
FTP, STP, ScTP	F/UTP	Foil	None	F/UTP twisted pair cable shielding
STP, ScTP	S/UTP	Braiding	None	S/UTP twisted pair cable shielding
SFTP, S-FTP, STP	SF/UTP	Braiding and Foil	None	SF/UTP twisted pair cable shielding
STP, ScTP, PiMF	U/FTP	None	Foil	U/FTP twisted pair cable shielding
FFTP, STP	F/FTP	Foil	Foil	F/FTP twisted pair cable shielding
SSTP, SFTP, STP, STP PiMF	S/FTP	Braiding	Foil	S/FTP twisted pair cable shielding
SSTP, SFTP, STP	SF/FTP	Braiding and Foil	Foil	SF/FTP twisted pair cable shielding

== Types ==
=== Analog telephone ===
Before digital communication and Ethernet became widespread, there was no international standard for telephone cable. Standards were set at a national level. For instance, in the UK the General Post Office specified CW1293 and CW1308 cables. CW1308 was a similar specification to the earlier CW1293 but with an improved color code. CW1293 used mostly solid colors on the cores, making it difficult to identify the pair it was twisted with without stripping back a large amount of sheath. To solve this problem. CW1308 has narrow rings of the paired color printed over the base color. Both cables are a similar standard to category 3 cable. Cables with categories 3 through 7 have 4 twisted pairs.

Prior to the common use of polyethylene and other plastics for insulation, telephone twisted pair cable was insulated with waxed paper or cotton with a wax coating applied to the copper. The overall sheath of this type of cable was usually lead. This style of cable came into use in the late 19th century shortly after the invention of the telephone. The cable terminations in termination boxes were sealed with molten wax or a resin to prevent the ingress of moisture, which would seriously degrade the insulating properties of the paper insulation. However, such seals made future maintenance and changes more difficult. These cables are no longer made but are still occasionally encountered in old buildings and in various external areas, commonly rural villages.

=== Building infrastructure ===
Standard types of twisted pair cabling
Name	Typical construction	Bandwidth	Applications	Notes
Level 1		400 kHz	Telephone and modem lines	Not described in EIA/TIA recommendations. Unsuitable for modern systems.
Level 2		4 MHz	Older terminal systems, e.g. IBM 3270	Not described in EIA/TIA recommendations. Unsuitable for modern systems.
Cat 3	UTP	16 MHz	10BASE-T, 100BASE-T4	EIA/TIA-568. Unsuitable for speeds above 16 Mbit/s. Now mainly for telephone cables.
Cat 4	UTP	20 MHz	16 Mbit/s Token Ring	Not commonly used
Cat 5	UTP	100 MHz	100BASE-TX, 1000BASE-T	Superseded by Cat 5e, but most Cat 5 cables meet Cat 5e standards.
Cat 5e	UTP, F/UTP, U/FTP	100 MHz	1000BASE-T, 2.5GBASE-T	Enhanced Cat 5. Same construction as Cat 5, but with better testing standards.Common for current LANs.
Cat 6	UTP, F/UTP, U/FTP	250 MHz	5GBASE-T, 10GBASE-T	ISO/IEC 11801 2nd Ed. (2002), ANSI/TIA 568-B.2-1. Limited to 55 m distance at 10GBASE-T
Cat 6A	UTP, F/UTP, U/FTP, S/FTP	500 MHz	5GBASE-T, 10GBASE-T	ISO/IEC 11801 2nd Ed. Am. 2. (2008), ANSI/TIA-568-C.1 (2009). Improved standards, tested to 500 MHz.
Cat 7	S/FTP, F/FTP	600 MHz	?	ISO/IEC 11801 2nd Ed. (2002). Only with GG45 or TERA connectors. Not described in EIA/TIA recommendations.
Cat 7_{A}	S/FTP, F/FTP	1 GHz	?	ISO/IEC 11801 2nd Ed. Am. 2. (2008). Only with GG45 or TERA connectors. Not described in EIA/TIA recommendations.
Cat 8.1	F/UTP, U/FTP	2 GHz	25GBASE-T, 40GBASE-T	ISO/IEC 11801-1:2017, ANSI/TIA-568-C.2-1
Cat 8.2	S/FTP, F/FTP	2 GHz	25GBASE-T, 40GBASE-T	ISO/IEC 11801-1:2017

=== Loaded ===
A loaded twisted pair has intentionally added inductance and was formerly common practice on telecommunication lines. The added inductors are known as load coils and reduce attenuation for voiceband frequencies but increase it on higher frequencies. Load coils reduce distortion in voiceband on very long lines. In this context, a line without load coils is referred to as an unloaded line.

=== Bonded ===
A bonded twisted pair is a construction variant in which the two wires of each pair are bonded together for the length of the cable. Pioneered by Belden, it is intended to help assure configuration consistency during and after installation. One key benefit is that the noise immunity performance of the cable can be protected despite potentially rough handling. The enhanced performance may be unnecessary and bonding reduces the flexibility of the cable and makes it prone to failure where it is flexed.

=== Twisted ribbon cable ===
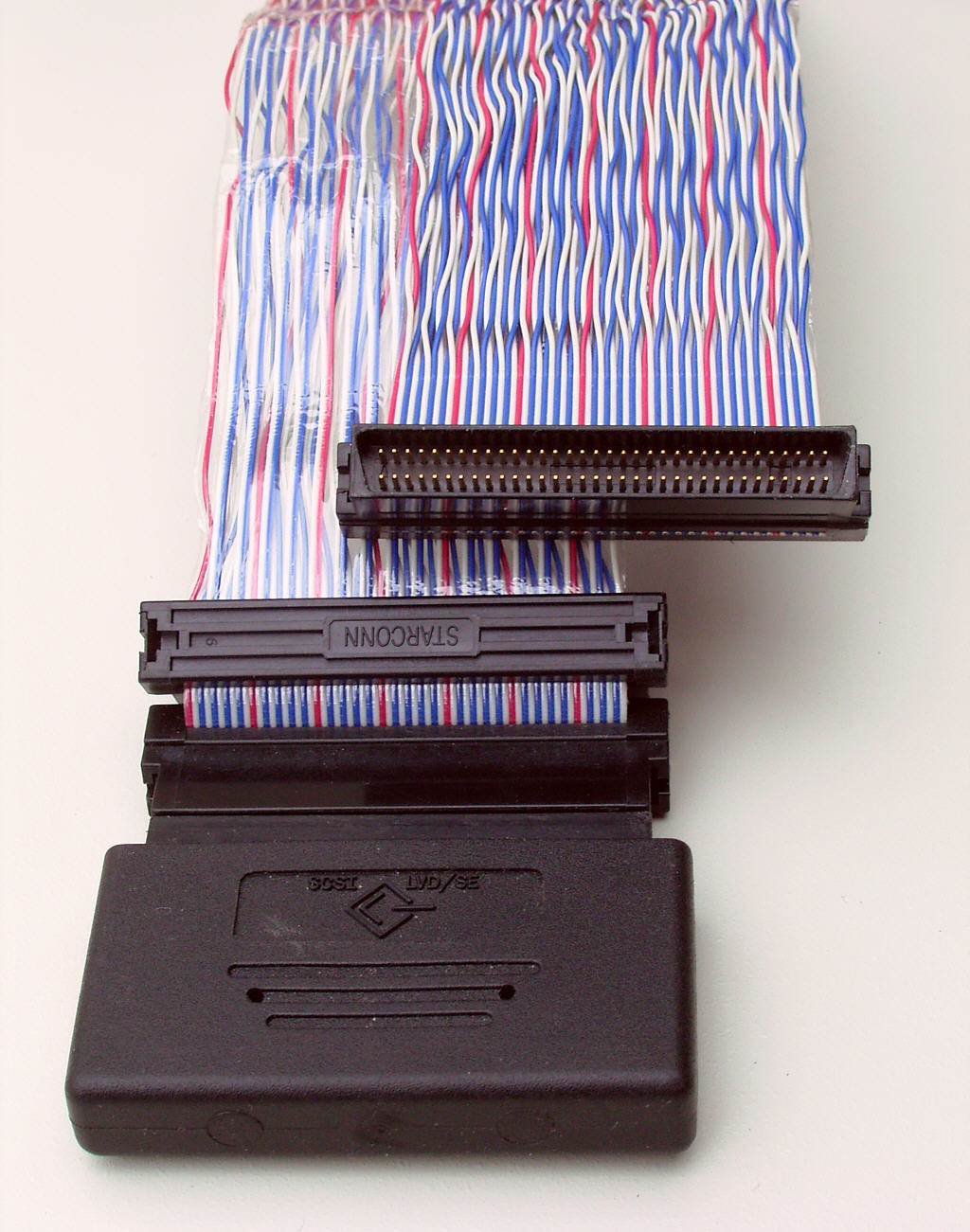
Twisted ribbon cable used for Parallel SCSI connections

A twisted ribbon cable is a variant of standard ribbon cable in which adjacent pairs of conductors are bonded and twisted together. The twisted pairs are then lightly bonded to each other in a ribbon format. Periodically along the ribbon, there are short sections with no twisting where connectors may be attached using the usual ribbon cable IDC techniques.

=== Solid-core vs. stranded cable ===
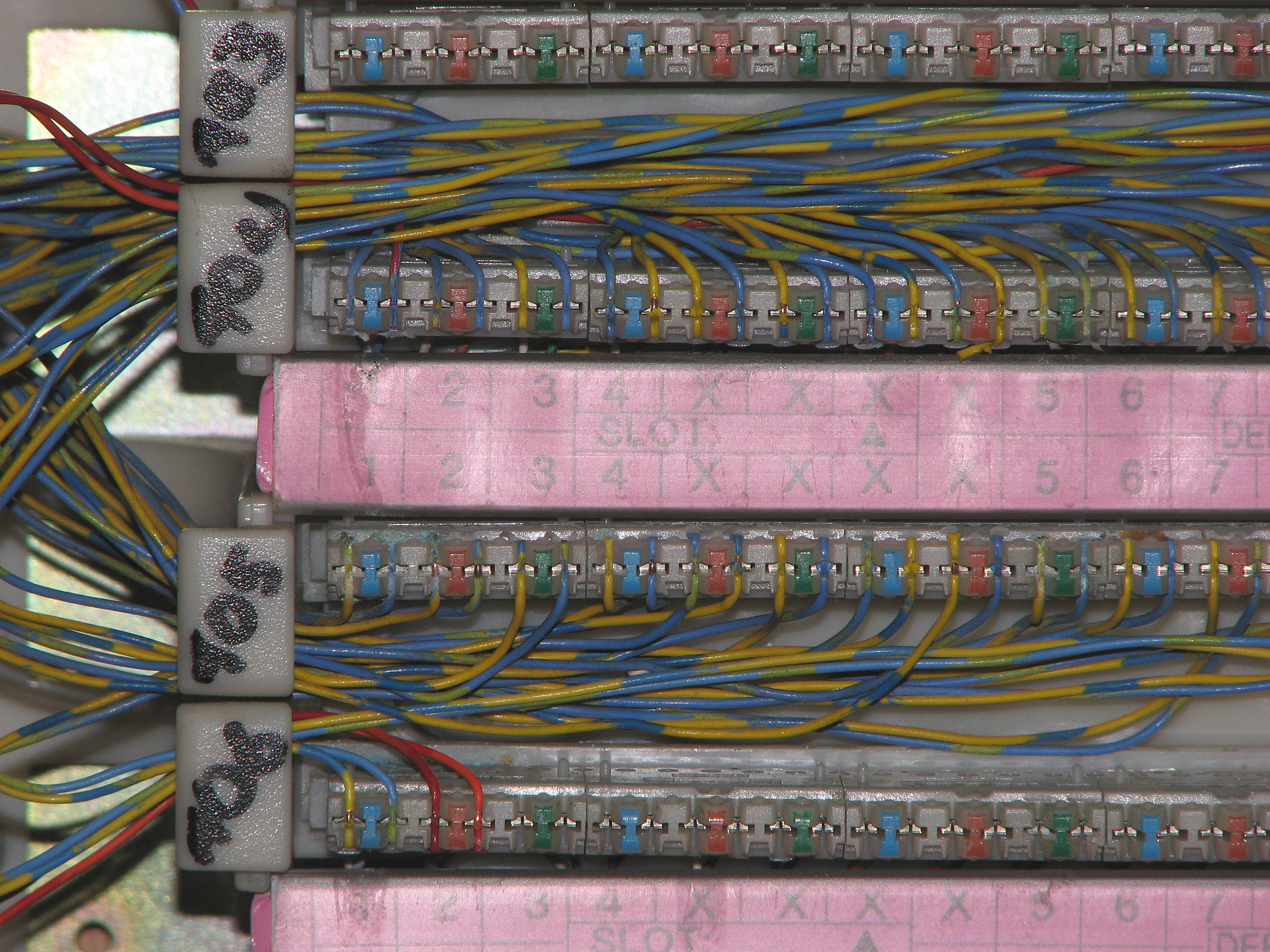
A punch-down block

A solid-core cable uses one solid wire per conductor and in a four-pair cable, there would be a total of eight solid wires. Stranded cable uses multiple wires wrapped around each other in each conductor and in a four-pair with seven strands per conductor cable, there would be a total of 56 wires (2 per pair × 4 pairs × 7 strands).

Solid core cable is intended for permanently installed runs (permanent link). It is less flexible than stranded cable and is more prone to failure if repeatedly flexed due to work hardening. Stranded cable is used at patch panels and for connections from wall ports to end devices (patch cord or drop cable), as it resists cracking of the conductors.

Connectors are designed differently for solid core than for stranded. Use of a connector with the wrong cable type can lead to unreliable cabling. Plugs designed for solid and stranded cores are readily available, and some vendors even offer plugs designed for use with both types. The punch-down blocks on patch-panel and wall-port jacks are designed for use with solid core cable. These work via the insulation-displacement method, whereby the device pierces the sides of the insulation and "bites" into the copper conductor to form a connection. Punchdown blocks are used as patch panels or as break-out boxes for twisted-pair cable.

== Properties ==
Twisted pair has the following useful attributes:

- Electrical noise going into or coming from the cable can be prevented.
- Crosstalk is minimized.
- Cheapest form of cable available for networking purposes.
- Easy to handle and install.

Twisted pair has the following limitations:

- Deformation: twisted pair's susceptibility to electromagnetic interference greatly depends on the pair twisting schemes staying intact during the installation. As a result, twisted pair cables usually have stringent requirements for maximum pulling tension as well as minimum bend radius. This fragility of twisted-pair cables makes the installation practices an important part of ensuring the cable's performance.
- Delay skew: due to different twist rates used to minimize crosstalk between the pairs, different pairs within the cable have different lengths and thus different delays. This can degrade image quality when multiple pairs are used to carry components of a video signal. Low-skew cable is available to mitigate this problem.
- Imbalance (see balanced line): differences between the two wires in a pair can cause coupling between the common mode and the differential mode. Line differential to common mode conversion produces common-mode currents that can cause external interference and can produce common-mode signals in other pairs. Common mode to differential mode conversion can produce differential mode signals from common-mode interference from other pairs or external sources. Imbalance can be caused by asymmetry between the two conductors of the pair from each other and in relationship to other wires and the shield. Some sources of asymmetry may result from differences in the conductor diameter and insulation thickness. (Note: In telephone jargon, the common mode is called longitudinal and the differential mode is called metallic.)

== See also ==
- ANSI/TIA-568
- Balanced line
- Copper wire and cable
- Ethernet over twisted pair
- Litz wire
- Main distribution frame, used for connecting twisted pairs in telephone networks
- Registered jack, often used as connectors for twisted pair
- Star quad cable increases cancellation of interference
- Tip and ring
