= List of early Ethernet standards =

Early 10 Mbit/s Ethernet standards

The early generation of Ethernet standards had a maximum throughput of 10 Mbit/s. In 10BASE-X, the 10 represents its maximum throughput of 10 Mbit/s, BASE indicates its use of baseband transmission, and X indicates the type of medium used. Classic Ethernet includes coax, twisted pair and optical variants. The first Ethernet standard was published in 1983 and classic Ethernet operating at 10 Mbit/s was the dominant form of Ethernet until the first standard for Fast Ethernet was approved in 1995.

== Varieties ==
Name	Standard	Status	Media	Connector	Transceiver Module	Reach in m	# Media (⇆)	# Lambdas (→)	# Lanes (→)	Notes
Classic coaxial Ethernet - (Data rate: 10 Mbit/s - Line code: PE - Line rate: 20 MBd - Full-Duplex / Half-Duplex)
10BASE5; Thick Ethernet; DIX Standard	802.3-1983 (CL8)	obsolete 09/2003	Coax; RG-8 (50 Ω)	AUI, N, Vampire tap	MAU	500	1	N/A	1	LAN; original standard; electrical bus topology with collision detection; uses a single coaxial cable into which you literally tap a connection by drilling into the cable to connect to the core and screen.
10BASE2; Thin Ethernet; ThinNet; Cheapernet	802.3a-1988 (CL10)	obsolete 09/2011	Coax; RG-58 (50 Ω)	BNC, EAD/TAE-E	MAU	185	1	N/A	1	LAN; dominant standard from the mid to late 1980s; electrical bus topology with collision detection; coaxial cable connects machines together, each machine using a T-connector to connect to its NIC. Requires terminators at each end.
Classic fibre Ethernet - (Data rate: 10 Mbit/s - Line code: PE - Line rate: 20 MBd - Full-Duplex / Half-Duplex)
FOIRL	802.3d-1987 (CL9.9)	superseded	Fibre; 850 nm	ST	MAU	OF: 1k	2	1	1	original standard for Ethernet over fiber; uses any optical fiber with up to 4 dB/km attenuation and at least 150 MHz bandwidth; superseded by 10BASE-FL
10BASE-FL	802.3j-1993 (CL15/18)	largely obsolete	Fibre; 850 nm	ST	MAU	FDDI: 2k	2	1	1	Nodes
10BASE-FB	802.3j-1993 (CL15/17)	largely obsolete	Fibre; 850 nm	ST	MAU	FDDI: 2k	2	1	1	synchronous inter-repeater connections
10BASE-FP	802.3j-1993 (CL15/16)	obsolete	Fibre; 850 nm	ST	MAU	FDDI: 1k	2	1	1	passive, repeaterless star network; Market Failure, never implemented

== Fibre-based standards (10BASE-F) ==
10BASE-F, or sometimes 10BASE-FX, is a generic term for the family of 10 Mbit/s Ethernet standards using fiber-optic cable. In 10BASE-F, the 10 represents a maximum throughput of 10 Mbit/s, BASE indicates its use of baseband transmission, and F indicates that it relies on a medium of fiber-optic cable. The technical standard requires two strands of 62.5/125 μm multimode fiber. One strand is used for data transmission while the other is used for reception, making 10BASE-F a full-duplex technology. There are three different variants of 10BASE-F: 10BASE-FL, 10BASE-FB and 10BASE-FP. Of these only 10BASE-FL experienced widespread use. With the introduction of later standards 10 Mbit/s technology has been largely replaced by faster Fast Ethernet, Gigabit Ethernet and 100 Gigabit Ethernet standards.

=== FOIRL ===
Fiber-optic inter-repeater link (FOIRL) is a specification of Ethernet over optical fiber. It was specially designed as a back-to-back transport between repeater hubs to decrease latency and collision detection time, thus increasing the possible network radius. It was replaced by 10BASE-FL.

=== 10BASE-FL ===
10BASE-FL is the most commonly used 10BASE-F specification of Ethernet over optical fiber. In 10BASE-FL, FL stands for fiber optic link. It replaces the original fiber-optic inter-repeater link (FOIRL) specification, but retains compatibility with FOIRL-based equipment. When mixed with FOIRL equipment, the maximum segment length is limited to FOIRL's 1000 meters.

=== 10BASE-FB ===
The 10BASE-FB is a network segment used to bridge Ethernet hubs. Here FB abbreviates FiberBackbone. Due to the synchronous operation of 10BASE-FB, delays normally associated with Ethernet repeaters are reduced, thus allowing segment distances to be extended without compromising the collision detection mechanism. The maximum allowable segment length for 10BASE-FB is 2000 meters. This media system allowed multiple half-duplex Ethernet signal repeaters to be linked in series, exceeding the limit on the total number of repeaters that could be used in a given 10 Mbit/s Ethernet system. 10BASE-FB links were attached to synchronous signaling repeater hubs and used to link the hubs together in a half-duplex repeated backbone system that could span longer distances.

=== 10BASE-FP ===
In 10BASE-FP, FP denotes fibre passive. This variant calls for a non-powered optical signal coupler capable of linking up to 33 devices, with each segment being up to 500 m in length. This formed a star network centered on the signal coupler. A LAN implementing this standard was applied as a branch LAN to construct an all-optical fiber hierarchical integrated LAN with a high-speed LAN (FDDI, etc.) as the backbone.

== See also ==
- 10BASE-T
