= Physical media =

Physical materials used to store or transmit information

Physical media refers to the physical materials that are used to store or transmit information in data communications. These physical media are generally physical objects made of materials such as copper or glass. They can be touched and felt, and have physical properties such as weight and color. For a number of years, copper and glass were the only media used in computer networking.

The term physical media can also be used to describe data storage media like records, cassettes, VHS, LaserDiscs, CDs, DVDs, and Blu-ray discs, especially when compared with modern streaming media or content that has been downloaded from the Internet onto a hard drive or other storage device as files.

== Types of physical media ==
=== Copper wire ===
Copper wire is currently the most commonly used type of physical media due to the abundance of copper in the world, as well as its ability to conduct electrical power. Copper is also one of the cheaper metals, which makes it more feasible to use.

Most copper wires used in data communications today have eight strands of copper, organized in unshielded twisted pairs, or UTP. The wires are twisted around one another because it reduces electrical interference from outside sources. In addition to UTP, some wires use shielded twisted pairs (STP), which reduce electrical interference even further. The way copper wires are twisted around one another also has an effect on data rates. Category 3 cable (Cat3) has three to four twists per foot and can support speeds of 10 Mbit/s. Category 5 cable (Cat5) is newer and has three to four twists per inch, which results in a maximum data rate of 100 Mbit/s. In addition, there are category 5e (Cat5e) cables which can support speeds of up to 1,000 Mbit/s, and more recently, category 6 cables (Cat6), which support data rates of up to 10,000 Mbit/s (i.e., 10 Gbit/s).

On average, copper wire costs around $1 per foot.

=== Optical fiber ===
Optical fiber is a thin and flexible piece of fiber made of glass or plastic. Unlike copper wire, optical fiber is typically used for long-distance data communications, as it allows for data transmission over far distances and can produce high transmission speeds. Optical fiber also does not require signal repeaters, which ends up reducing maintenance costs, since signal repeaters are known to fail often.

There are two major types of optical fiber in use today. Multimode fiber is approximately 62.5 μm in diameter and utilizes light-emitting diodes to carry signals over a maximum distance of about 2 kilometers. Single-mode fiber is approximately 10 μm in diameter and is capable of carrying signals over tens of miles.

Like copper wire, optical fiber currently costs about $1 per foot.

=== Coaxial cables ===
Coaxial cables have two different layers surrounding a copper core. The innermost layer has an insulator. The next layer has a conducting shield. These are both covered by a plastic jacket. Coaxial cables are used for microwaves, televisions and computers. This was the second transmission medium to be introduced (often called coax), around the mid-1920s. In the center of a coaxial cable is a copper wire that acts as a conductor, where the information travels. The copper wire in coax is thicker than that in twisted-pair, and it is also unaffected by surrounding wires that contribute to electromagnetic interference, so it can provide higher transmission rates than twisted-pair. The center conductor is surrounded by plastic insulation, which helps filter out extraneous interference. This insulation is covered by a return path, which is usually braided-copper shielding or aluminum foil type covering. Outer jackets form a protective covering for coax; the number and type of outer jackets depend on the intended use of the cable (e.g., whether the cable is supposed to be strung in the air or underground, whether rodent protection is required). The two most popular types of coaxial cabling are used with Ethernet networks.

Thinnet is used on Ethernet 10BASE2 networks and is the thinner and more flexible of the two. Unlike a thicknet, it uses a Bayonet Neill–Concelman (BNC) on each end to connect to computers. Thinnet is part of the RG-58 family of cable with a maximum cable length of 185 meters and transmission speeds of 10 Mbit/s.

Thicknet coaxial cabling is used with Ethernet 10BASE5 networks, has a maximum cable length of 500 meters and transmission speeds of 10 Mbit/s. It's expensive and not commonly used, though it was originally used to directly connect computers. The computer is connected to the transceiver at the cable from the attachment unit interface of its network card using a drop cable. The maximum number of thicknet nodes on a segment is 100. One end of each cable is grounded.

==== Application ====
In the midst of the 1920s, coax was applied to telephone networks as inter-office trunks. Rather than adding more copper cable bundles with 1500 or 1000 pairs of copper wire and cable in them, it was possible to replace those big cables with much smaller coaxial cable.

The next major use of coax in telecommunications occurred in the 1950s, when it was deployed as submarine cable to carry international traffic. It was then introduced into the data processing realm in the mid 1960s. Early computer architectures required coax as the media type from the terminal to the host. Local area networks were predominantly based on coax from 1980 to about 1987.

Coax has also been used in cable TV and the local loop, in the form of HFC architecture. HFC brings fiber as close as possible to the neighborhood. Fiber terminates at the neighborhood node, where coax fans out to provide home service.

==== Advantages ====
- Broadband system-coax has sufficient frequency range to support multiple channels, allowing greater throughput.
- Greater channel capacity - each of the multiple channels offers substantial capacity depending on the service location (6 MHz wide in North America, 8 MHz wide in Europe).
- Greater bandwidth - compared to twisted pairs, it has greater bandwidth for each channel. This allows it to support a mixed range of services (voice, data, video, multimedia).
- Lower error rates - the inner conductor serves as a Faraday shield that protects the network from electronic noise.

==== Disadvantages ====
- The bus network on which coax is deployed is susceptible to congestion, noise and security risks.
- Great noise - the return path has some noise problems, and the end equipment requires added intelligence to take care of error control.
- High installation costs
- Susceptible to damage from lightning strikes - if lightning is conducted by a coaxial cable, it could very easily damage the equipment at the end of it.

== Debate on physical media ==
With technology constantly changing, there is a debate on whether physical media is still prudent and necessary to an increasingly wireless world. Wireless and physical media may actually complement each other, and physical media will matter more, not less, in a society dominated by the wireless technology. However, other people consider physical media a dead technology that will eventually disappear.

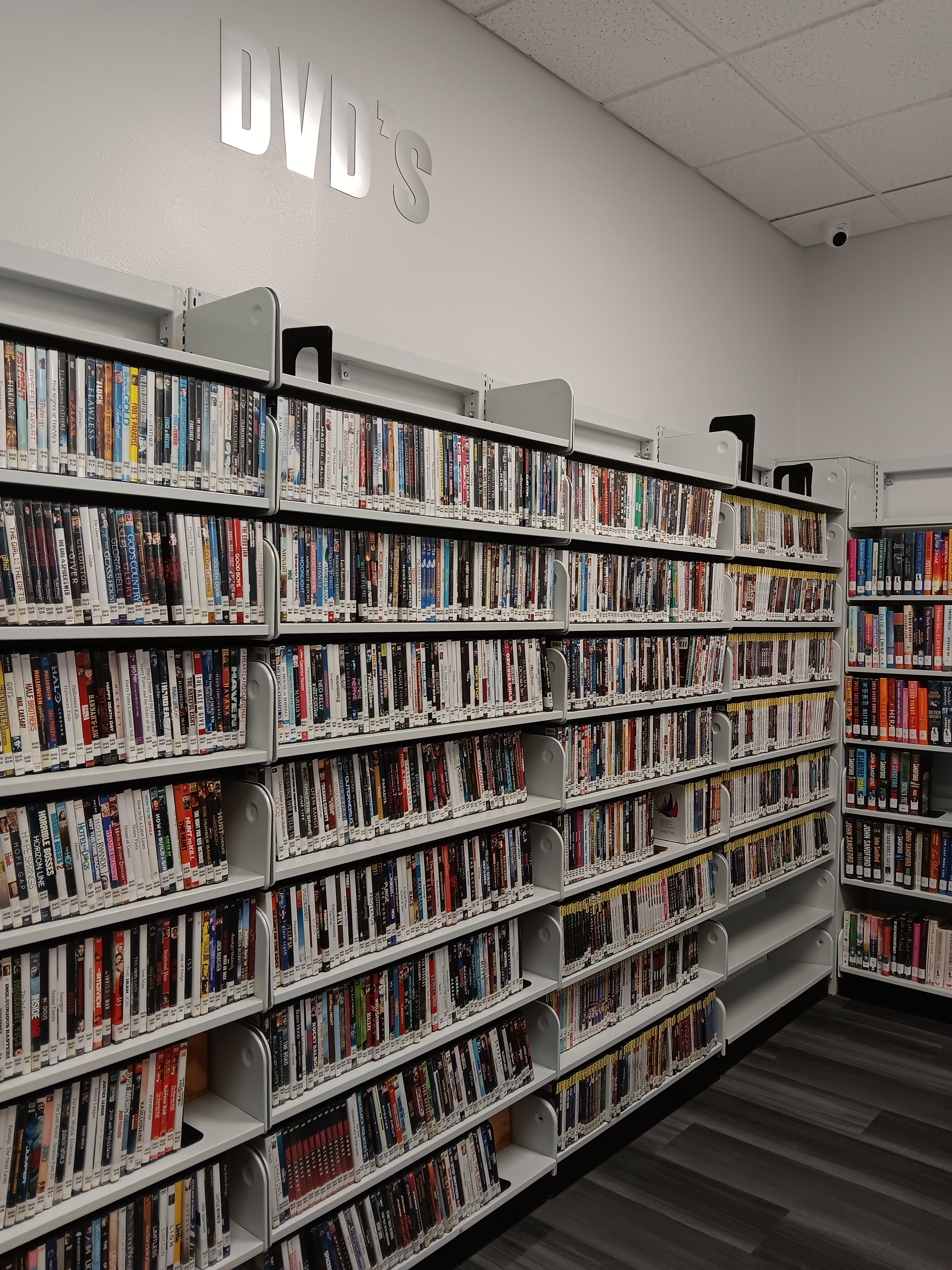
A library with physical media in Benbrook, Texas

=== Sony's discontinuation of disc drives ===
On July 1, 2026, Sony announced that they would not release any more games on disc, starting January 2028. Controversially, many gamers or fans have shown disagreement about the movement to digital-only gaming.
