= Fiber media converter =

Network device

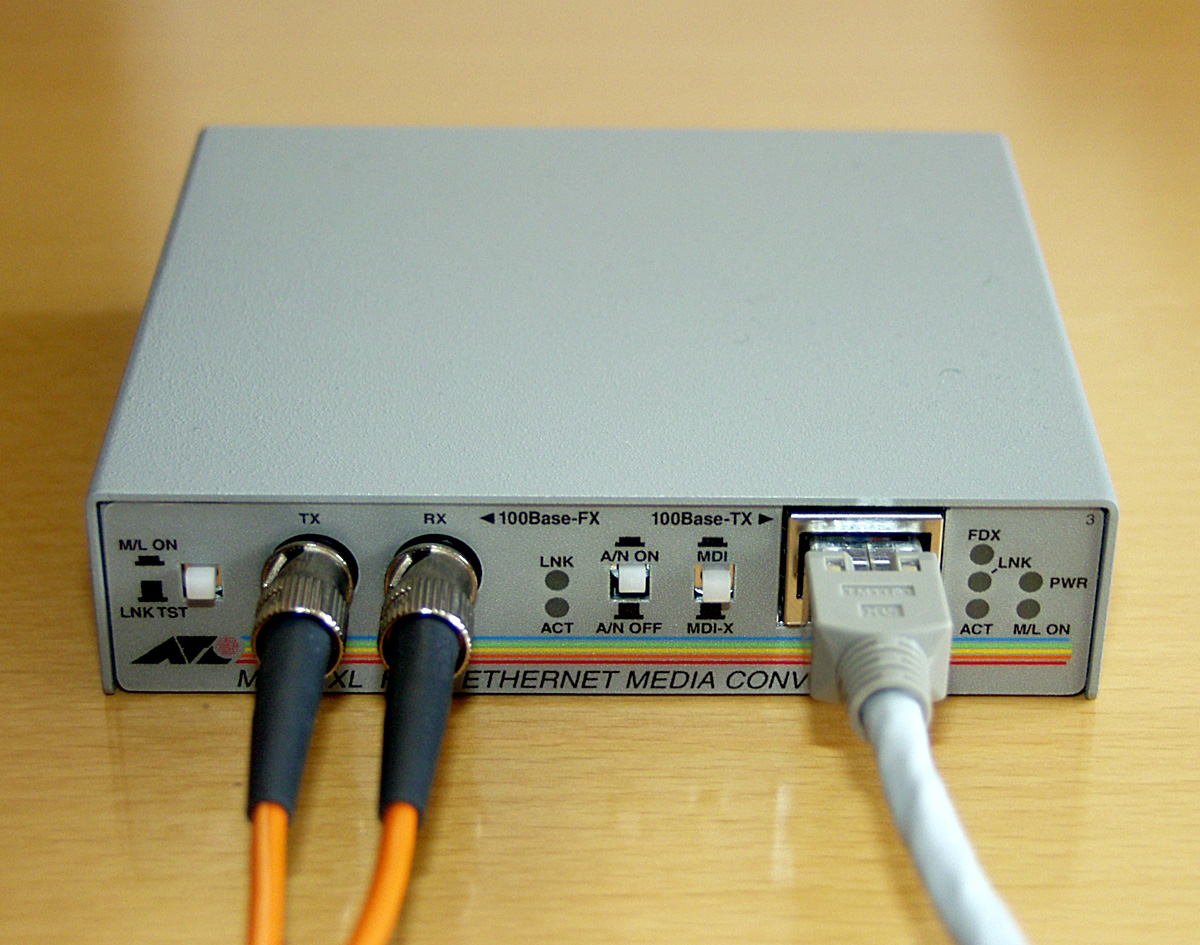
A Fast Ethernet fiber converter (100BASE-FX using ST connector to 100BASE-TX using modular connector)

A fiber media converter is a simple networking device that makes it possible to connect two dissimilar media types such as twisted pair with fiber optic cabling. They were introduced to the industry in the 1990s, and are important in interconnecting fiber optic cabling-based systems with existing copper-based structured cabling systems. They are also used in metropolitan area network (MAN) access and data transport services to enterprise customers.

== Media conversion types ==
Fiber media converters support many different data communication protocols including Ethernet, Fast Ethernet, Gigabit Ethernet, T1/E1/J1, DS3/E3, as well as multiple cabling types such as coax, twisted pair, multi-mode and single-mode fiber optics. Media converter types range from small standalone devices and PC card converters to high port-density chassis systems that offer many advanced features for network management.

On some devices, Simple Network Management Protocol (SNMP) enables proactive management of link status, monitoring chassis environmental statistics and sending traps to network managers in the event of a fiber break or even link loss on the copper port.

Fiber media converters can connect different local area network (LAN) media, modifying duplex and speed settings. Switching media converters can connect different speed network segments. For example, existing half-duplex hubs can be connected to 100BASE-TX Fast Ethernet network segments over 100BASE-FX fiber.

When expanding the reach of the LAN to span multiple locations, media converters are useful in connecting multiple LANs to form one large campus area network that spans over a limited geographic area. As premises networks are primarily copper-based, media converters can extend the reach of the LAN over single-mode fiber up to 160 kilometers with 1550 nm optics.

Wavelength-division multiplexing (WDM) technology in the LAN is especially beneficial in situations where fiber is in limited supply or expensive to provision. As well as conventional dual strand fiber converters, with separate receive and transmit ports, there are also single-strand fiber converters, which can extend full-duplex data transmission up to 120 kilometers over one optical fiber.

Other benefits of media conversion include providing a gradual migration path from copper to fiber. Fiber connections can greatly extend the reach and reduce electromagnetic interference.

Also fiber media converters pose as an alternative solution for switches not supporting fiber; ordinary switches can use fiber media converters to connect to a fiber network.

== Converter types ==
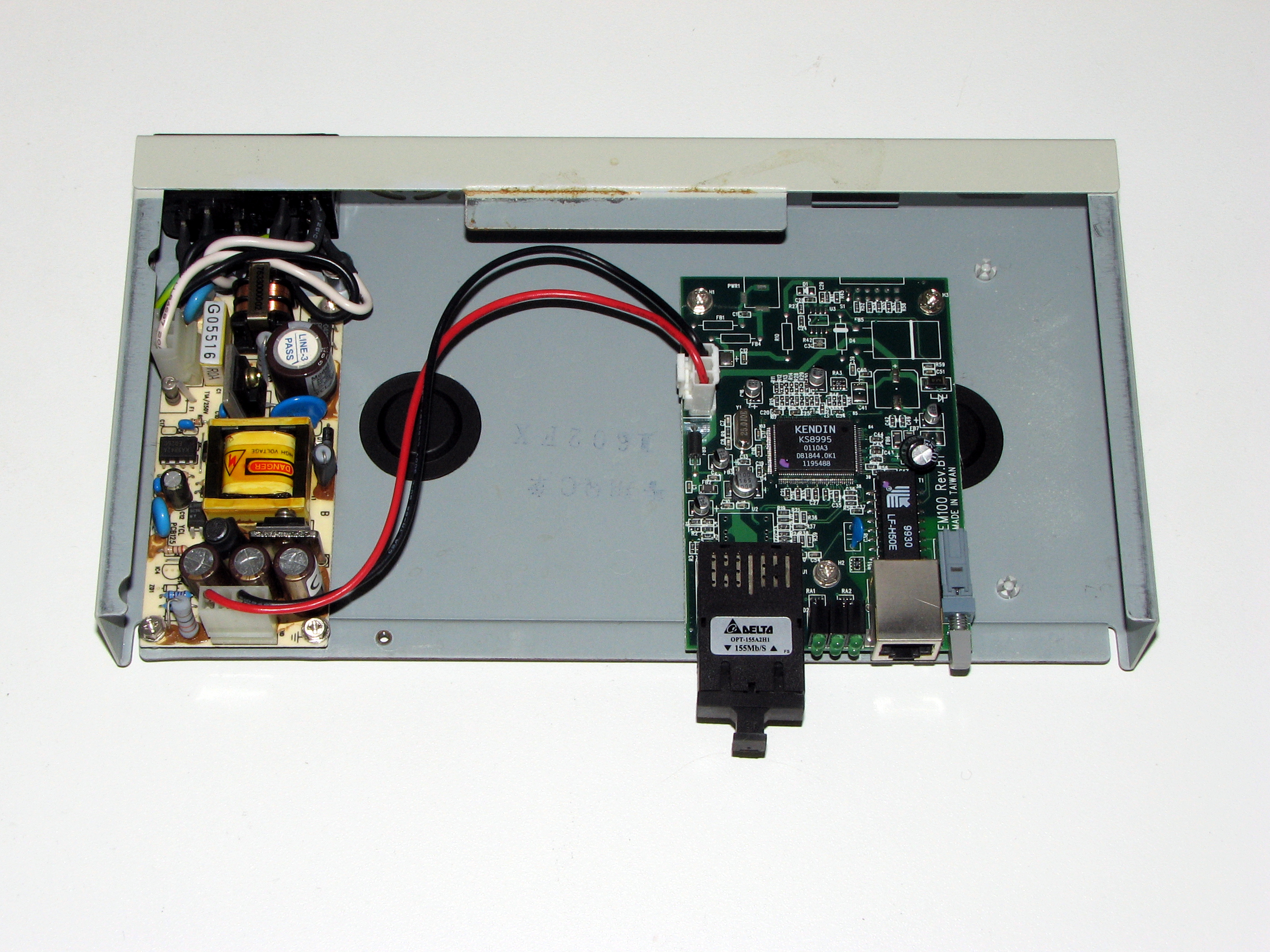
Opened case of a switching Fast Ethernet media converter (100BASE-TX to 100BASE-FX using SC connector)

Simple converters – when the speed and duplex settings on both media is identical – consist of two pairs of transmitters/receivers, each with their medium-dependent interfaces (when no data recoding is necessary) or their media-independent interfaces joined together back-to-back in a dual-simplex fashion. They can transport either half-duplex or full-duplex traffic but both sides must match.

Switching converters contain a network bridge and can connect two half-duplex segments without joining their collision domains.

Managed converters are usually of the switching kind and can additionally be managed by a network connection or a local console. However, most often pluggable transceivers are used instead when appropriate equipment already exists.

== See also ==
- Gigabit interface converter
- Fiber-optic communication
- Small Form-factor Pluggable
