= Line terminator =

Line terminator may refer to either:

- Newline, a special character or sequence of characters signifying the end of a line of text
- Electrical termination, at the end of a wire or cable to prevent an RF signal from being reflected
