= Ethernet over fibre =

Ethernet physical layers using fiber optics

Ethernet over fibre is a networking technology that delivers Ethernet bandwidth ranging up to 800 Gbit/s using optical fibre lines. Such wired transmission methods extend connectivity over long distances up to 200 kilometres (120 mi), support higher bitrates and provide far greater immunity from electromagnetic interference (EMI) than electrical connections. Copper-based Ethernet connections are generally limited to a maximum length of 100 metres (330 ft) or less, a maximum speed of 40 Gbit/s, and they are more easily affected by surrounding EMI.

== Background ==
Ethernet over fibre has emerged as a preferred medium in situations that require long-distance communication, high speeds or a high level of immunity from electromagnetic interference (EMI). With fibre-optic cables, data can be transmitted over much greater distances compared to copper-based Ethernet cable.

Ethernet over fibre-optic cable has been a technology with specifications dating back to the mid 1980s (10BASE-F). Initially, fibre-optic cables were primarily used to connect repeaters when the distance between them exceeded the limitations of ThickNet cable. The initial specification, known as Fibre-optic inter-repeater link (FOIRL), outlined the process of linking two repeaters using fibre-optic cable, allowing for connections of up to 1,000 metres (3,300 ft) in length. With the disappearance of half-duplex connections and improvements in fibre-optic communication, distances and data rates increased greatly.
