= Physical medium =

Physical medium may refer to:

- Transmission medium, a system or substance that can mediate the propagation of signals for the purposes of telecommunication
- Physical mediumship, the manipulation of energies and energy systems by spirits

== See also ==
- Physical media, physical materials that are used to store or transmit information in data communications
