= Medium Attachment Unit =

Transceiver in an Ethernet network

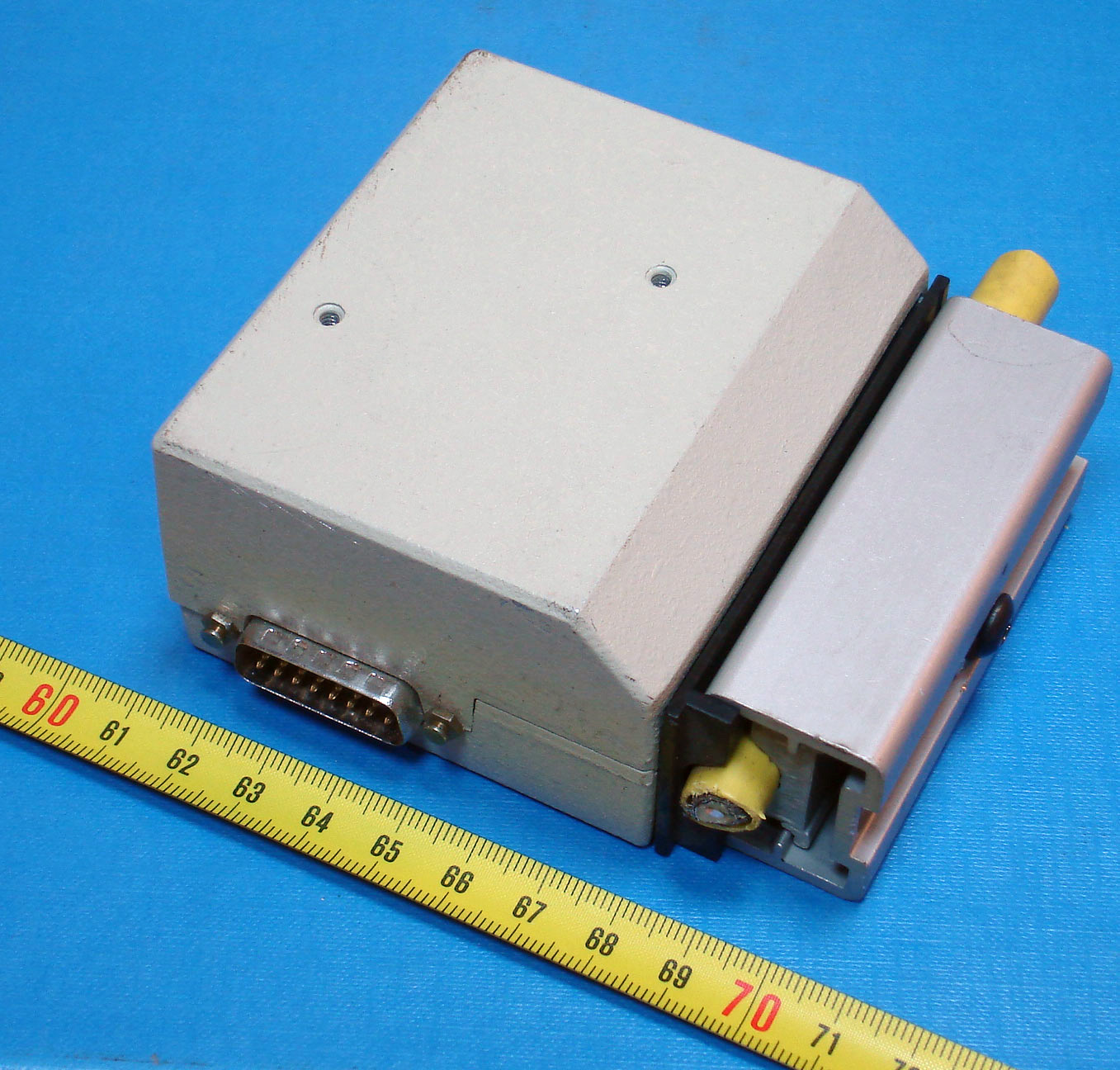
A thicknet MAU. The vampire tap is shown with a piece of yellow coaxial cable (cut off on either side of the tap) of the type used for 10BASE5 Ethernet.

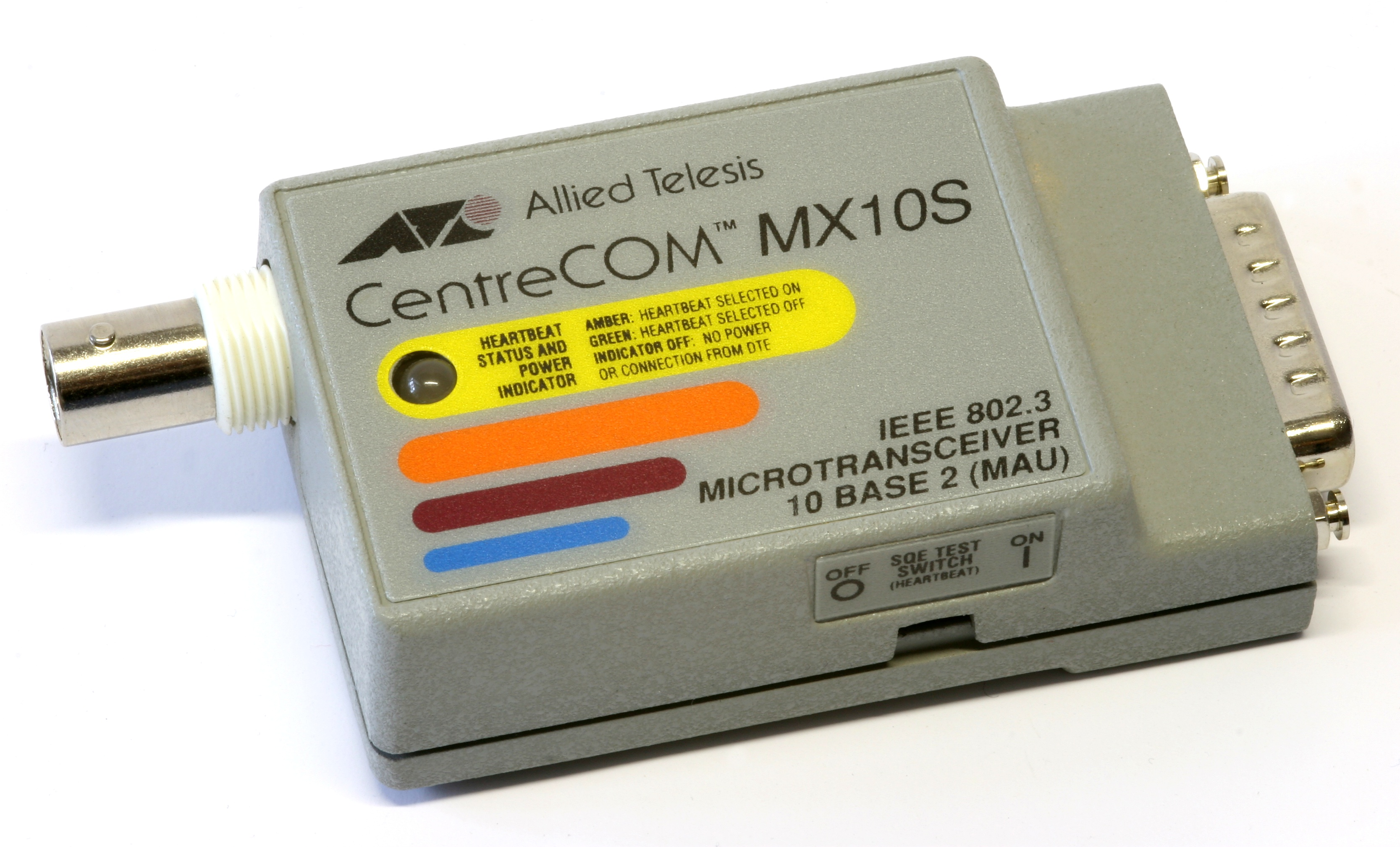
A thinnet MAU, showing a single BNC and a DA15 connector

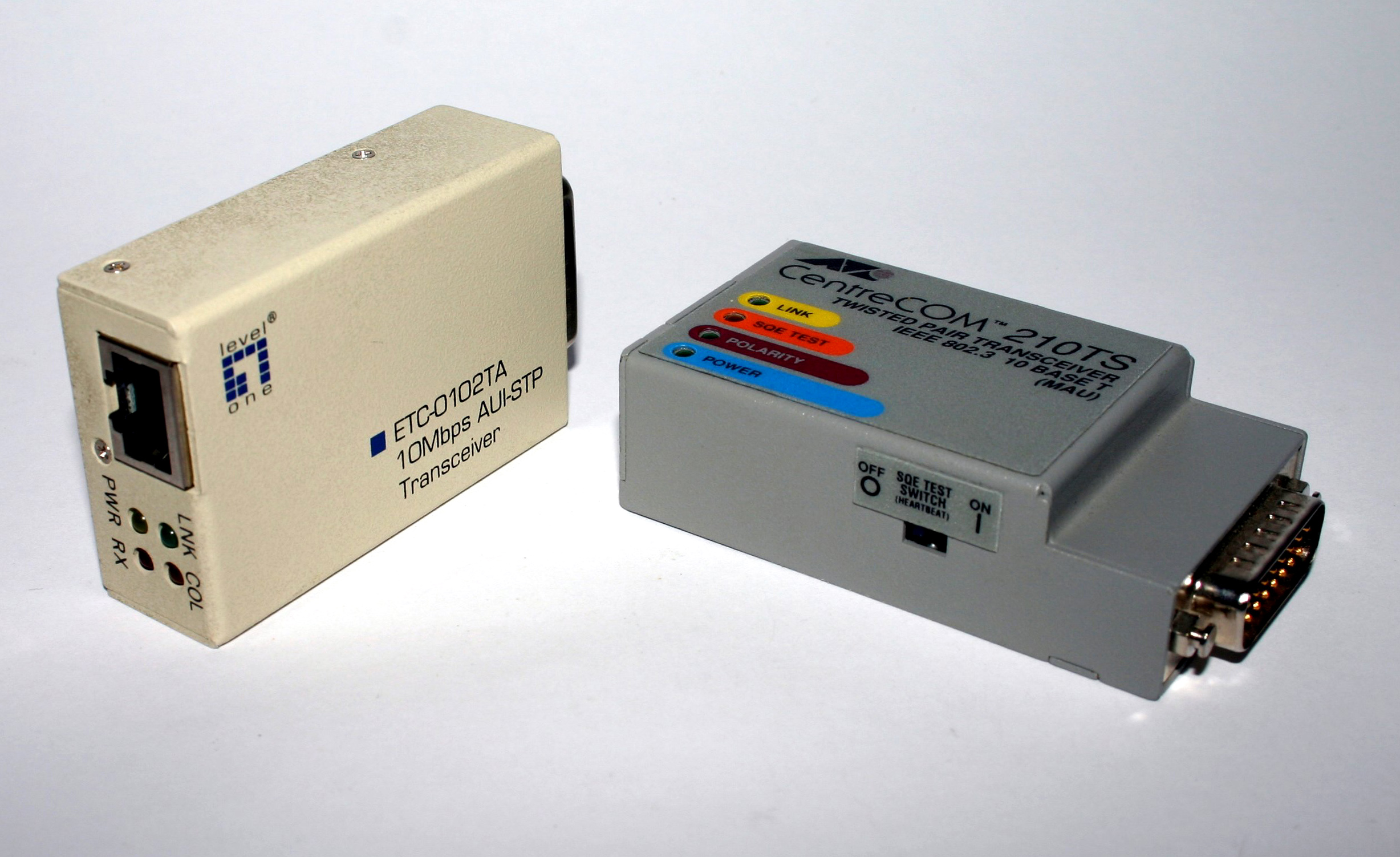
Two Medium Attachment Units (MAUs). The units shown are backwards-compatibility–oriented 10BASE-T MAUs, not older 10BASE5 or 10BASE2 MAUs.

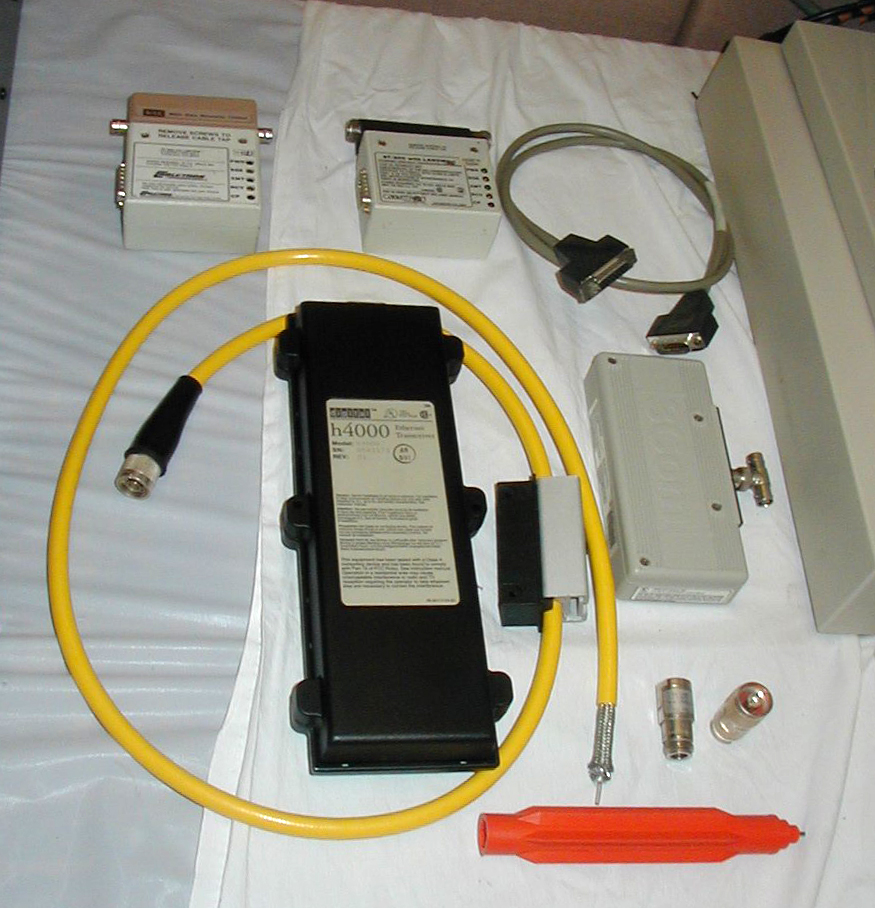
A collection of old Ethernet equipment. At the top of the image, from left to right: A thinnet MAU with passthrough BNC connectors and a DA15 connector, a thicknet MAU with passthrough N connectors and a DA15 connector, and an AUI cable for connection of an MAU to the DA15 port.

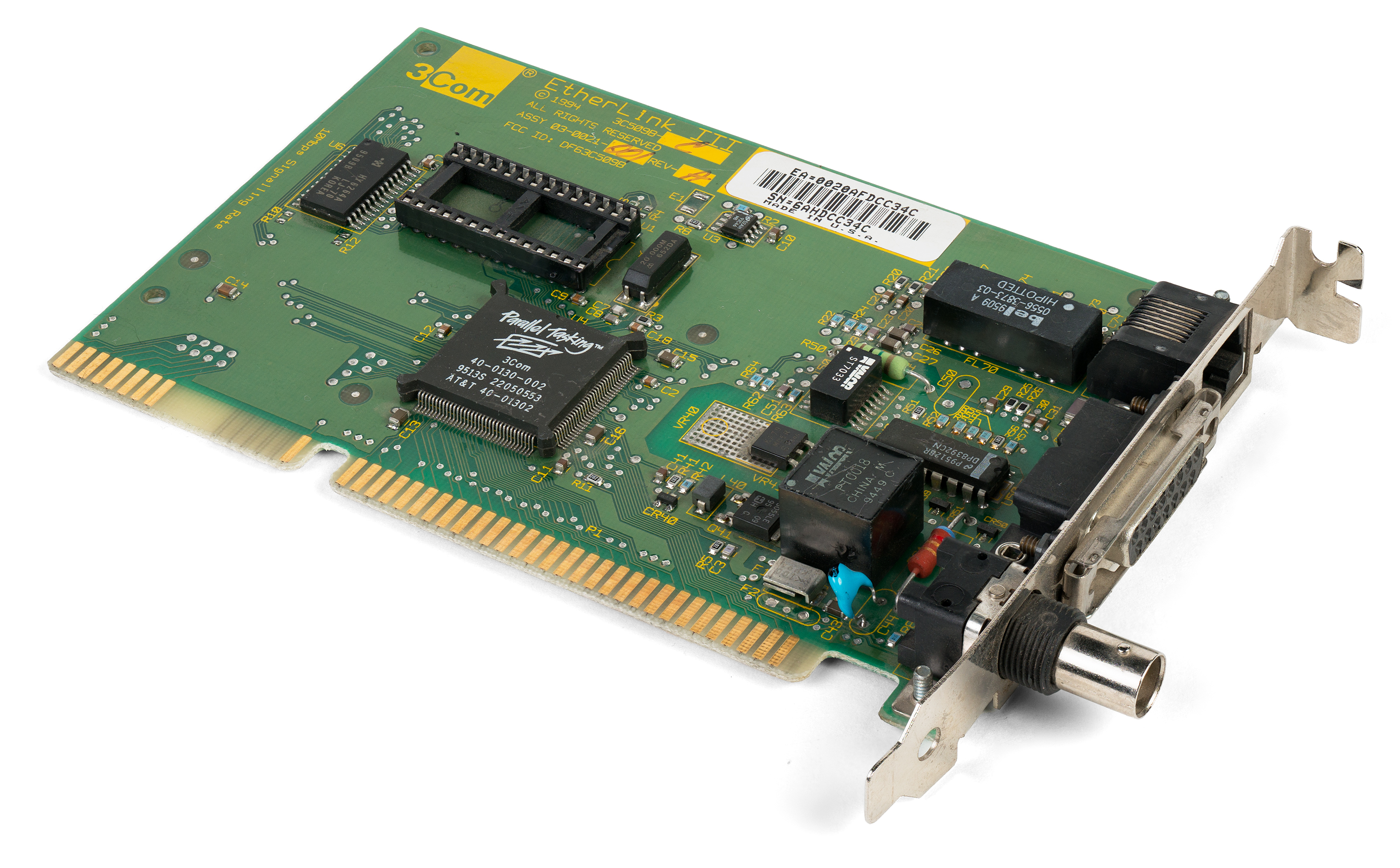
A 16-bit ISA network card engineered for compatibility with existing equipment. It includes both an AUI for connection to an external MAU (of any type) and its own MAU-type circuitry integrated on the board, which it uses in case of direct connection of thinnet cable to its BNC connector or twisted-pair cable to its 8P8C connector.

A Medium Attachment Unit (MAU) is a transceiver which converts signals on an Ethernet cable to and from Attachment Unit Interface (AUI) signals.

On original 10BASE5 (thicknet) Ethernet equipment, the MAU was typically clamped to the Ethernet wire via a vampire tap and connected by a multi-wire cable to the computer via a DA-15 port, which was also present on the network interface controller (NIC). This AUI cable could be up to 50 metres (160 ft) long, but was typically much shorter. With later standards, thicknet vampire taps and N connectors gave way to BNC connectors (for thinnet coax cables) and 8P8C connectors (for twisted-pair cables). MAUs for these were still connected to NICs via AUI cables, but soon the MAU ceased to be a separate adapter and was generally integrated into the NIC. Eventually, the entire Ethernet controller was often integrated into a single integrated circuit (chip) to reduce cost.

In most modern switched or hubbed Ethernet-over-twisted-pair systems, neither the MAU nor the AUI interfaces exist (apart, perhaps as notional entities for the purposes of thinking about layering the interface), and the Category 5 (CAT5) (or better) cable connects directly into a twisted-pair Ethernet port of the equipment. For backward compatibility with equipment that still had external AUI interfaces only, adapter-type MAUs with 10BASE2 or 10BASE-T connectors long remained available after the obsolescence of original vampire tap MAUs, but even adapter-type MAUs have become very rare as of the 2020s.

== Similar equipment ==
The original Ethernet's successor standard, Fast Ethernet, introduced division into medium access control (MAC) and physical (PHY) layers connected with media-independent interface (MII). Some early Fast Ethernet hardware had physical external MII connectors, functionally similar to the AUI connector, but generally separate adaptors became obsolete. However, the tradition of using a separate low-level I/O device in networking has continued in fast optical fiber network interfaces, where the GBIC, XENPAK, XFP, and SFP transceiver modules play a similar role.

The main difference between AUI and MII is that the AUI deals with line-coded signals, which is specific to the physical medium (10BASE5, 10BASE2 and 10BASE-T all use the same line code), while MII is genuinely media-independent. So while MII and AUI as external connections were similar from a user's point of view, in terms of signalling the equivalent of MII for classic Ethernet were the non-standardized interfaces between MAC and Serial Interface as found in e.g. the Am7990 family.

== Objectives ==
The purpose of an MAU is to provide the physical means for communication between local network data link entities. As a physical interface, an MAU can be implemented independently among different hardware manufacturers and achieve the intended level of compatibility when interconnected in a common local network. It also allows for ease of installation and service.

MAUs provide an easily accessible communication channel capable of high bandwidth and low bit error ratio performance, at relatively low cost.

== Characteristics ==
MAUs support message traffic at a data rate of 10, 100, or even 1000 Mbit/s. They can provide for driving up to 500m of coaxial trunk cable without the use of a repeater. Additionally, an MAU:

- Enables coupling the Physical Layer Signalling (PLS) by way of the AUI to the explicit baseband coaxial transmission system.
- Permits the DTE to test the MAU and the medium itself.
- Supports system configurations using the CSMA/CD access mechanism defined with baseband signaling.
- Supports bus topology interconnection.

=== Services provided by MAUs ===
In addition to receiving and transmitting network data, MAUs perform jabber detection, in which they remove from the network any node that continuously transmits for longer than the maximum-length packet. This is done to prevent network disruption. Jabbering indicates a possible problem with the node's NIC.

MAUs also help troubleshoot problems with signal quality and integrity. They can test for signal quality errors, which can detect silent failures in the circuitry, as well as perform link integrity functions, which can detect breaks in wire pairs. Both these tests assist in fault isolation.

Collision detection and loop-back functions direct transfer through the MAU.

=== Two modes of operation ===
In normal mode, the MAU functions as a direct connection between the baseband medium and the data terminal equipment (DTE), enabling message traffic between stations. Data output from the DTE is output to the coaxial trunk medium and all data on the coaxial trunk medium is input to the DTE.

In monitor mode or isolated mode, the MAU functions as a receive-only connection between the baseband medium and the DTE. Data output from the DTE is suppressed and only data on the coaxial trunk medium is input to the DTE. This mode is for observing message traffic.

=== Functional specifications ===
- Transmit function – the ability to transmit serial data bit streams on the baseband medium from the local DTE entity and to one or more remote DTE entities on the same network.
- Receive function – the ability to receive serial data bit streams over the baseband medium.
- Collision Presence function – the ability to detect the presence of two or more stations' concurrent transmissions.
- Monitor function (optional) – the ability to inhibit the normal transmit data stream to the medium at the same time the normal receive function and collision presence function remain operational.
- Jabber function – the ability to automatically interrupt the transmit function and inhibit an abnormally long output data stream. It removes equipment from the network whenever it continuously transmits for periods significantly longer than required for a maximum-length packet, indicating a possible problem with the NIC.
