= Vampire tap =

Connection type in computer networks

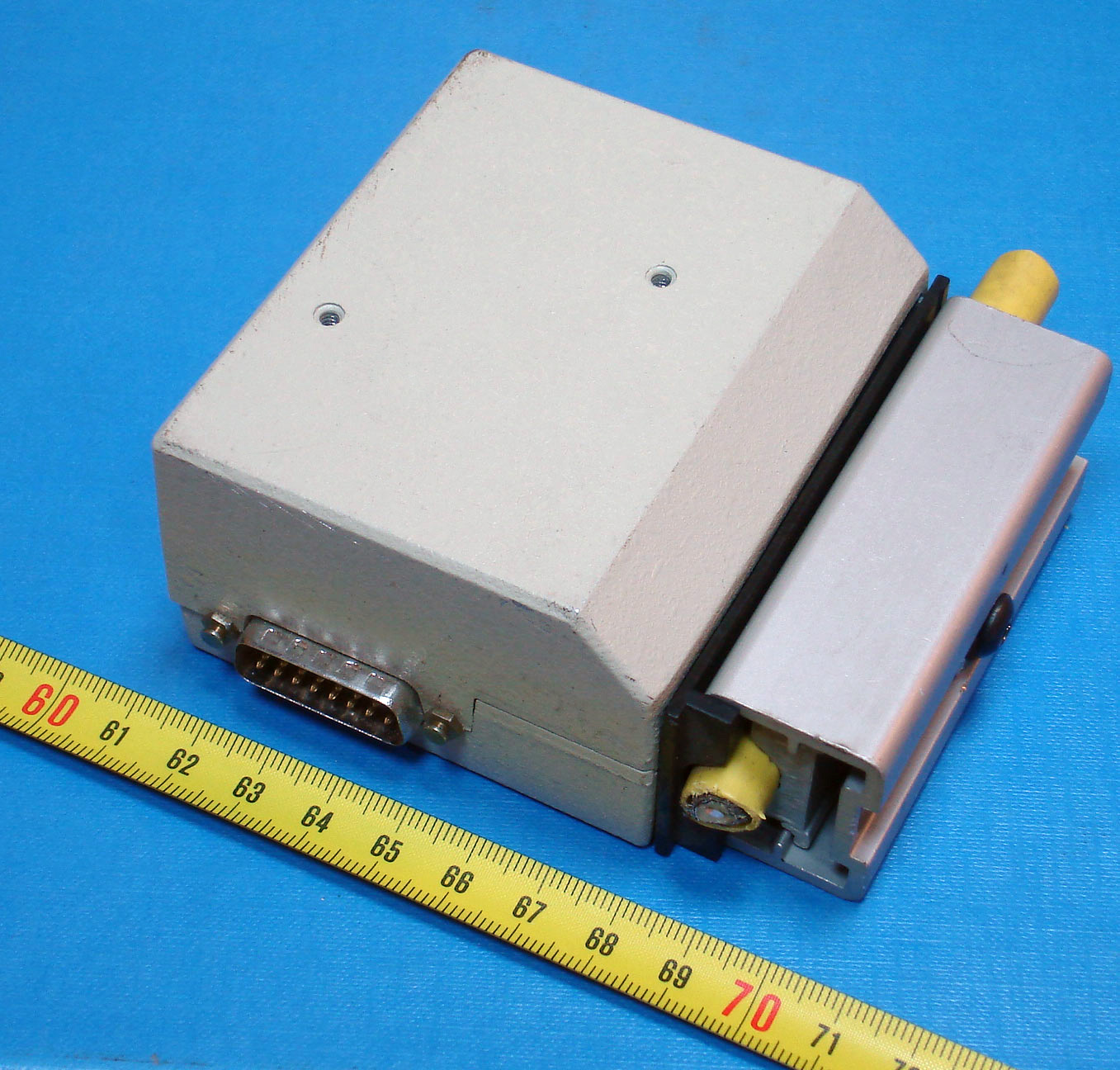
10BASE5 vampire tap with a Medium Attachment Unit (Transceiver) to the left of the tap

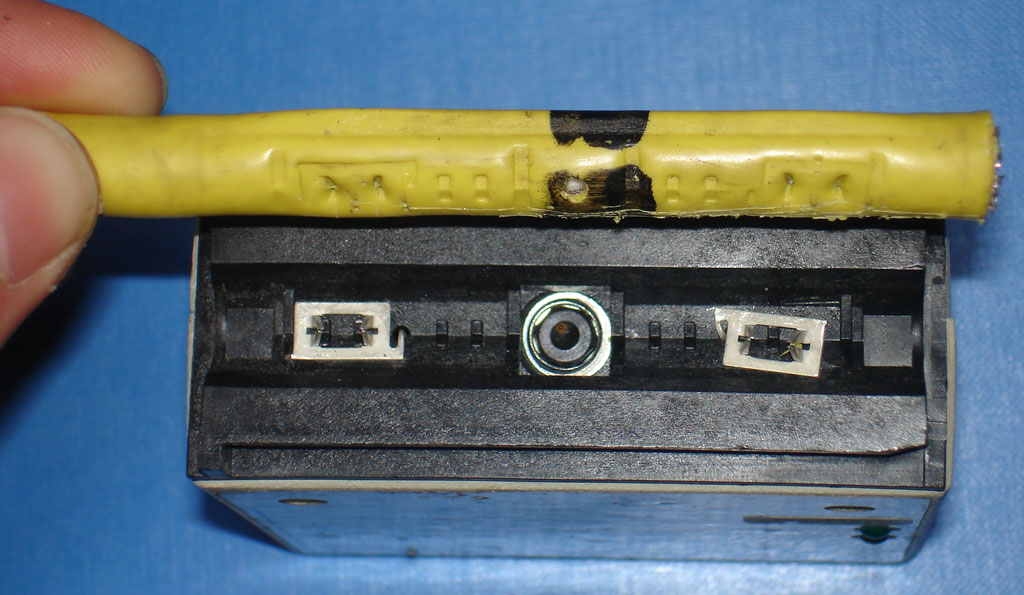
Dismantled vampire tap. Central metal-tipped insulated spike contacted cable core; smaller spikes contacted cable shield. Note black mark on cable sheath indicating suitable location for transceiver

A vampire tap (also called a piercing tap) is a device for physically connecting a station, typically a computer, to a network that used 10BASE5 cabling. This device clamped onto and "bit" into the cable (hence the name "vampire"), inserting a probe through a hole drilled using a special tool through the outer shielding to contact the inner conductor, while other spikes bit into the outer conductor.

The vampire tap usually had an integrated AUI (Attachment Unit Interface) in the form of a DA-15 connector, from which a short multicore cable connected to the network card in the station (host computer).

Vampire taps allowed new connections to be made on a given physical cable while the cable was in use. This allowed administrators to expand bus topology network sections without interrupting communications. Without a vampire tap, the cable had to be cut and connectors had to be attached to both ends.

== See also ==
- Network tap
- Insulation-displacement connector
