= EAD socket =

EAD (Ethernet-Anschlussdose)
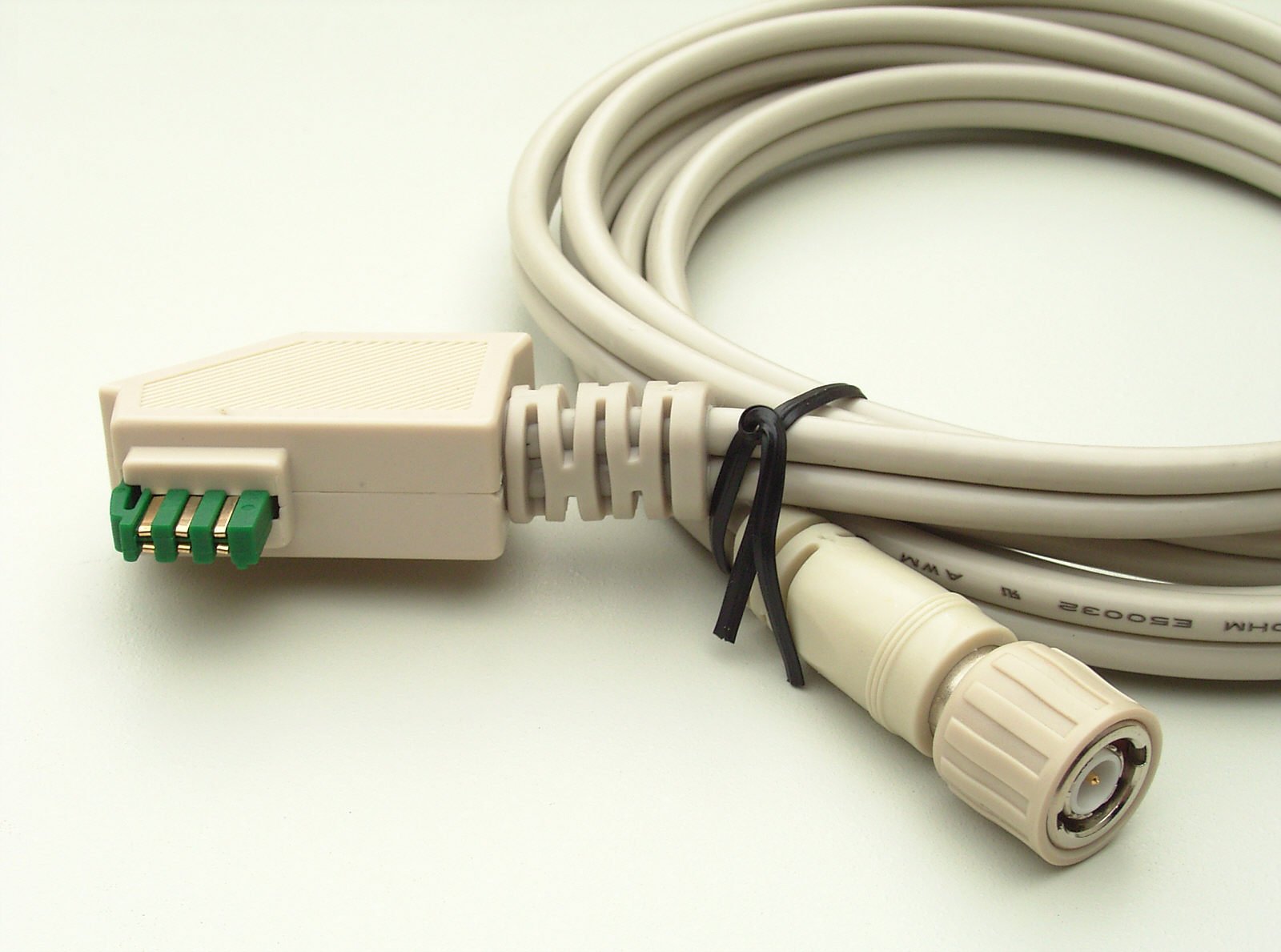
- EAD cable
- Type: Network connection
- Superseded: BNC connector
- Superseded by: Ethernet over twisted-pair

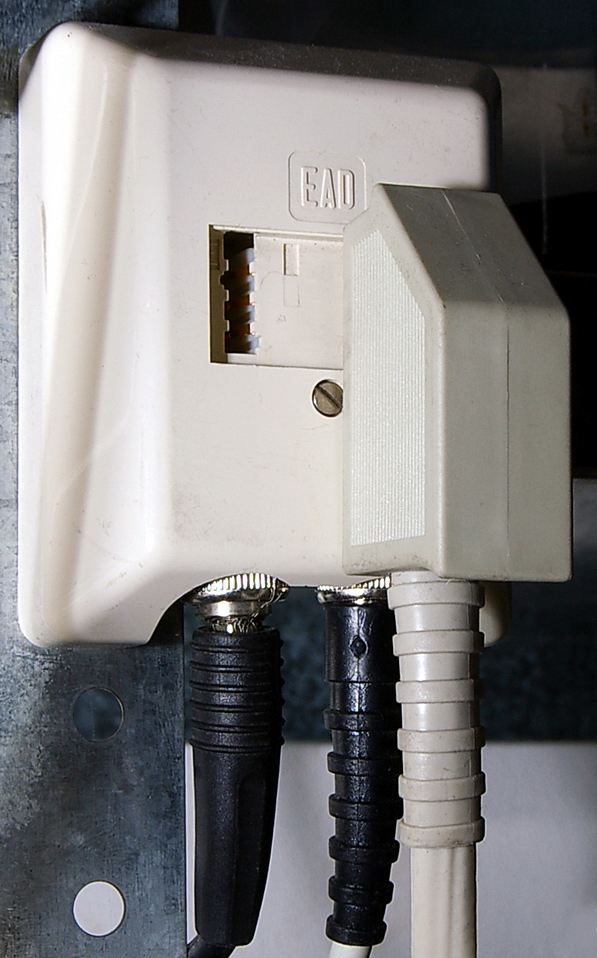
EAD outlet

EAD (German: Ethernet-Anschlussdose) is an obsolete connection standard for network plugs and sockets used in the early 1990s.

Ethernet networking of this period (mid 1980s to mid 1990s) used "thin coax" or 10BASE2. All devices on a network segment connected to the same electrical section of RG-58 coaxial cable. Intermediate devices were connected via a T piece. The two ends of the segment were terminated with a resistive network terminator. Although these networks were reliable when connected, they were prone to accidental misconnection by non-technical office staff. This was particularly an issue when devices, such as desktop computers, were being added or removed from the network. Although a rare need at this time, the situation was even worse for portable laptops.

To avoid some of the drawbacks with 10BASE2 over BNC connectors, the EAD socket was one of several alternatives developed to give an "office friendly" network connector that could easily be connected and disconnected, and avoided the risk of making misconnections.

With the obsolescence of 10BASE2 networks, from the mid 1990s, in favour of Ethernet over twisted pair, EAD sockets became obsolete.

It was developed from TAE connectors for telephony applications but were intended for connecting coaxial network cables like 10BASE2. A different mechanical encoding (Type E) prevented mix-up with phone plugs.

EAD cables were duplex connections replacing two thin-wire cables, with the T-connector integrated into the BNC end. The contacts of an EAD outlet are closed if no connector is plugged in. When a cable is plugged in, the normally-closed contacts in the socket are opened so that signals pass through the loop cable. Worn out connectors or outlets can cause the same problems that haunted the simpler connectors but user errors are largely reduced.
