= Tee connector =

Three terminal electrical connector

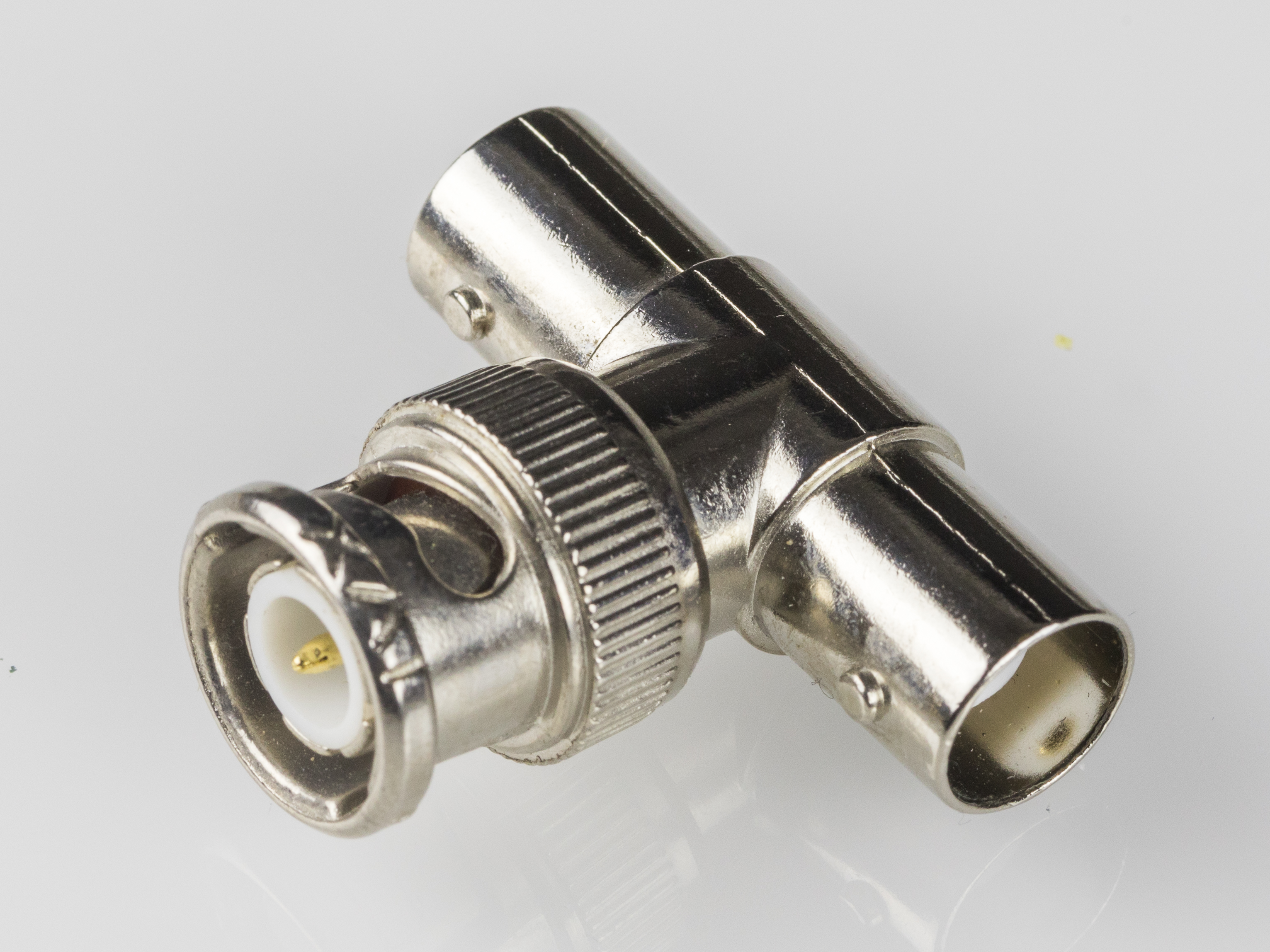
BNC tee connector

A tee connector is an electrical connector that connects three cables together. It is usually in the shape of a capital T. It is usually used for coax cables and the three connector points can be either female or male gender, and could be different or the same standard, such as F type, BNC or N type.

Tee connectors can be used to split radio frequency power from a cable into two. They can be used to attach a piece of electronic test equipment. Tee connectors were used to attach end stations to 10BASE2 Ethernet networks.
