= Attachment Unit Interface =

Ethernet standard interface

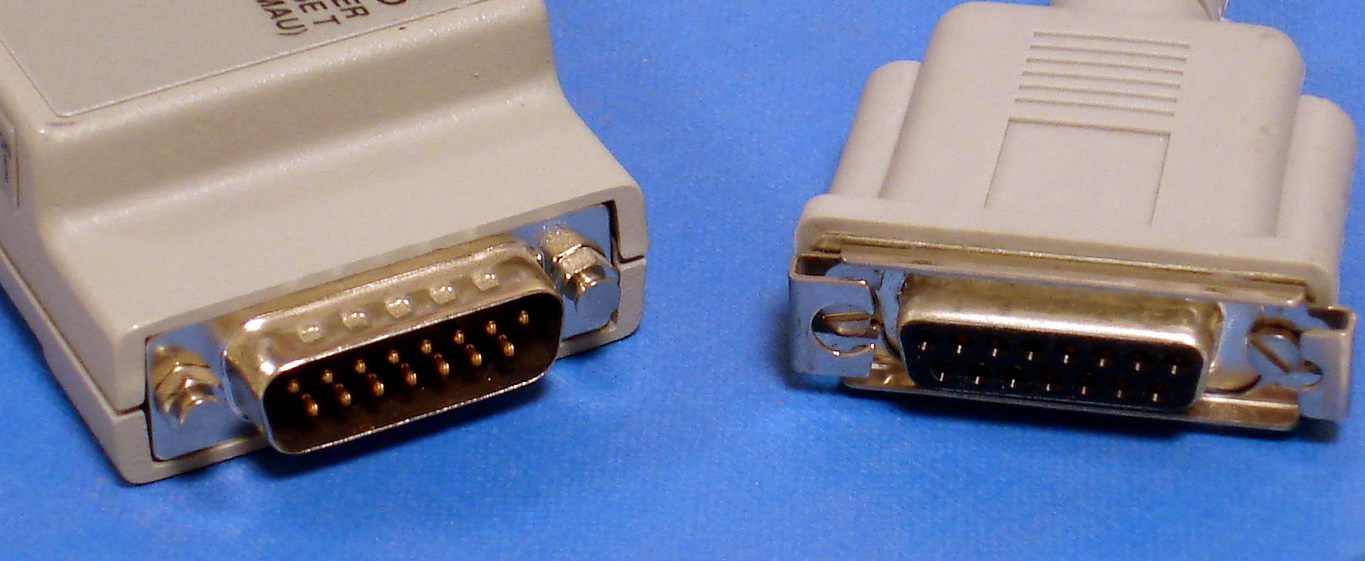
AUI Connectors. The male connector (left) is on the MAU, and the female connector (right) is on the DTE device (typically either a computer or an Ethernet hub). Note the sliding clip.

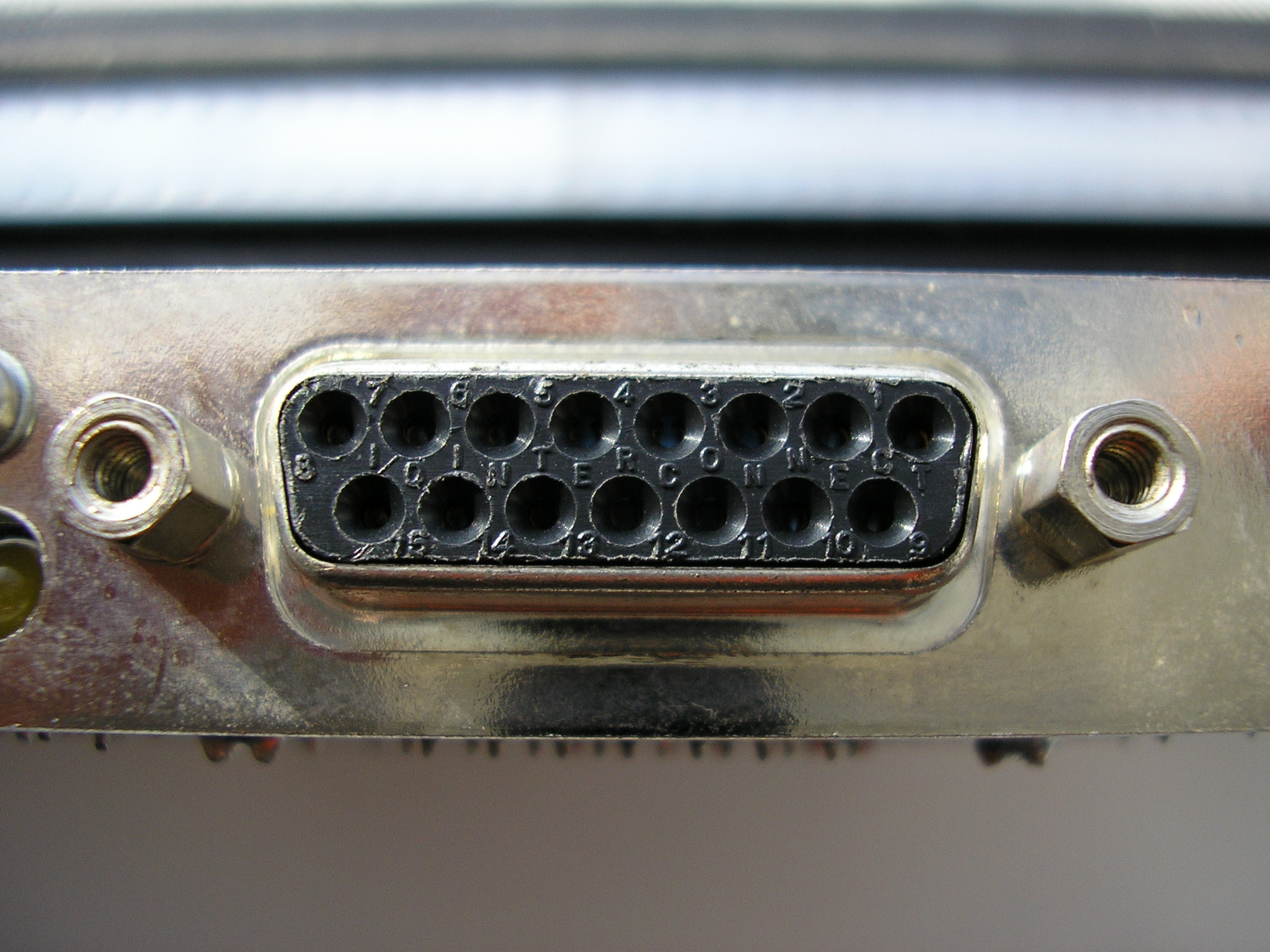
AUI Connector with numbered pins on the DEC EtherWorks LC (DE100) Ethernet controller. Note the jackposts (as opposed to a sliding clip).

The Attachment Unit Interface (AUI) is a physical and logical interface defined in the IEEE 802.3 standard (additionally published in FIPS PUB 107) for 10BASE5 Ethernet and the earlier DIX standard. The physical interface consists of a 15-pin D-subminiature connector that links an Ethernet node's physical signaling to the Medium Attachment Unit (MAU), sometimes referred to as a transceiver. An AUI cable can extend up to 50 metres (160 feet), though often the MAU and data terminal equipment's (DTE) medium access controller (MAC) are directly connected, bypassing the need for a cable. In Ethernet implementations where the DTE and MAU are combined, the AUI is typically omitted.

The IEEE 802.3 specification officially defines the AUI as an interconnect between a DTE and the MAU. However, devices like the DEC Digital Ethernet Local Network Interconnect (DELNI) provided hub-like functionality using AUI-compatible connectors. Additionally, under certain conditions, it was possible to directly connect two AUI devices without the need for transceivers using a crossover cable.

AUI connectors became increasingly rare in the early 1990s as computers and hubs directly integrated the MAU, especially with the rising adoption of the 10BASE-T standard. This shift led to the decline of 10BASE5 (thicknet) and 10BASE2 (thinnet), which made use of the interface. The electrical AUI connection remained internally within equipment for some time. Transceivers with an AUI connector were also used by 10BASE-FL Multimode fiber.

With the introduction of Fast Ethernet, the AUI interface became obsolete and was replaced by the media-independent interface (MII). Subsequent Ethernet standards, such as Gigabit Ethernet and 10 Gigabit Ethernet, introduced the GMII and XGMII interfaces, respectively. A 10 Gigabit Ethernet interface, known as XAUI, was developed to extend the operational distance of XGMII and reduce the number of interface signals.

A smaller variant called the Apple Attachment Unit Interface (AAUI) was introduced on Apple Macintosh computers in 1991, and was phased out by 1998.

== Modes ==
The AUI can operate in both normal mode and monitor mode. In normal mode, it functions as a direct connection between the DTE and the network medium. Monitor mode, an optional feature, isolates the MAU's transmitter from the medium while allowing the DTE to observe network activity. This mode is useful for diagnostic and monitoring purposes without impacting the physical medium.

== Signaling and control ==
The AUI uses Manchester encoding for data transmission, which ensures clock synchronization without requiring a separate timing signal. The data and control circuits operate independently and are self-clocked. Control signals coordinate communication between the DTE and MAU, enabling error signaling, MAU isolation, and medium access requests.

== Connector and signals ==
An AUI connector is a DA-15 (D-subminiature) type, where the DTE side has a female connector and the MAU side has a male connector.

The connector often uses a sliding clip instead of the typical thumbscrews found on D-connectors, allowing the DTE and MAU to be directly attached, even when their size or shape would not accommodate thumbscrews. However, the clip mechanism is sometimes considered awkward or unreliable.

In the case of incompatible fittings, the jackposts or sliding clip can be unscrewed and replaced, or adapter dongles and cables can be used.

Electrically, the AUI's differential signals are designed for use with a 78 Ω cable and can transmit data between DTE and MAU at 10 Mbps over the standard's specified 50-meter length.

AUI drivers and receivers are required to tolerate wiring faults without permanent impairment of the pair. Signal jitter is controlled to within 1.5 nanoseconds across the interface.

== Pinout table ==
The DA-15 pinout is specified by the IEEE 802.3 standard and describes four differential pairs:

Attachment Unit Interface
Pin	Signal	Direction	Description
3	DO-A	AUI→MAU	Data Out Circuit A
10	DO-B	AUI→MAU	Data Out Circuit B
11	DO-S	AUI→MAU	Data Out Circuit Shield (Note: Grounded in AUI and capacitively coupled to V_{C} in MAU)
5	DI-A	MAU→AUI	Data In Circuit A
12	DI-B	MAU→AUI	Data In Circuit B
4	DI-S	MAU→AUI	Data In Circuit Shield
7	CO-A	AUI→MAU	Control Out Circuit A
15	CO-B	AUI→MAU	Control Out Circuit B
8	CO-S	AUI→MAU	Control Out Circuit Shield
2	CI-A	MAU→AUI	Control In Circuit A
9	CI-B	MAU→AUI	Control In Circuit B
1	CI-S	MAU→AUI	Control In Circuit Shield
6	V_{C}	–	Voltage Common (0 V) (Note: These two pins (V_{C}/VP) use a single twisted pair between AUI and MAU)
13	VP	–	Voltage Plus (+12 V) (Note: VP is optional, but must provide a stable voltage for all current less than 500 mA)
14	VS	–	Voltage Shield
Shell	PG	–	Protective Ground
