= 10BASE2 =

Once-dominant 10 Mbit/s Ethernet standard

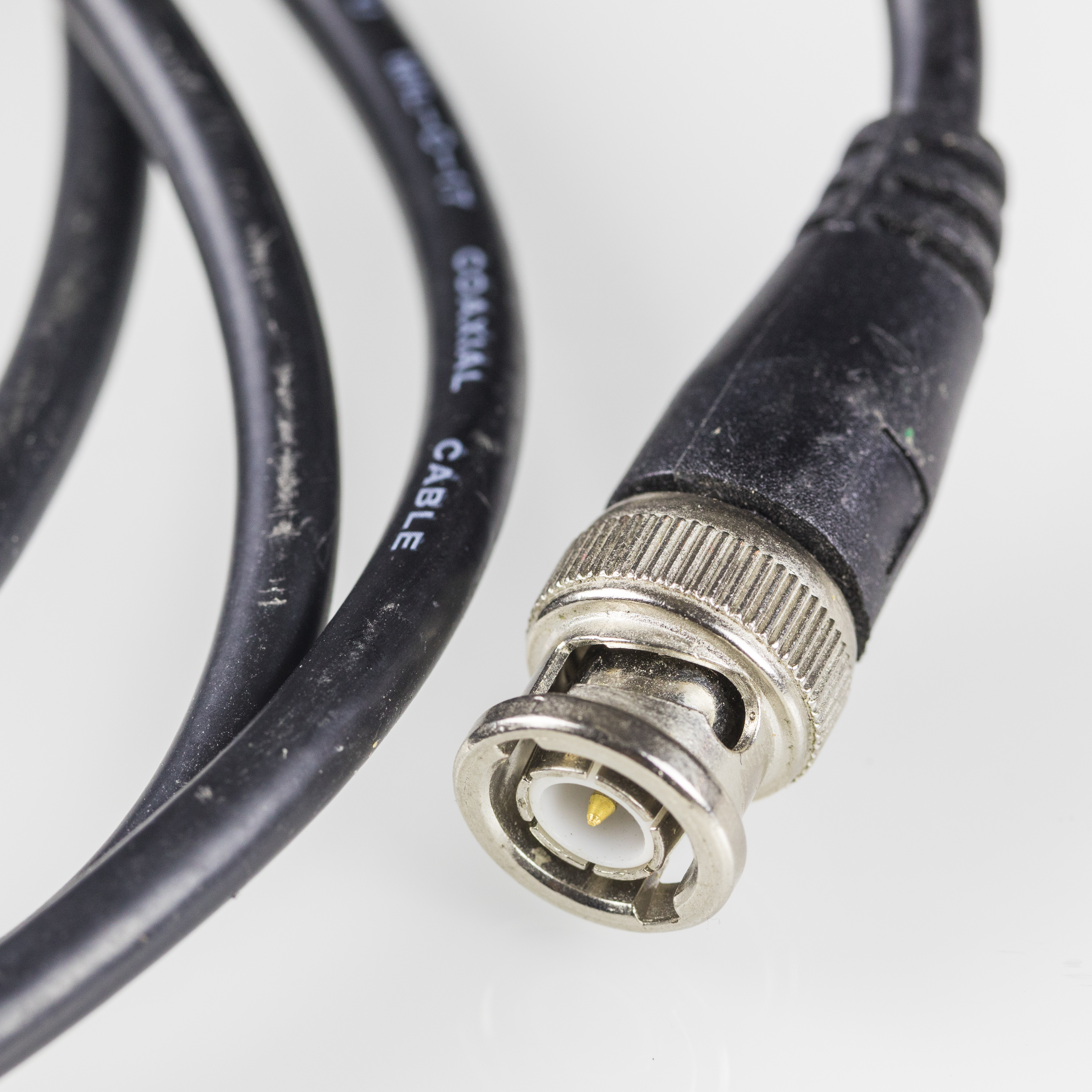
10BASE2 cable showing the BNC connector end

10BASE2 (also known as cheapernet, thin Ethernet, thinnet, and thinwire) is a variant of Ethernet that uses thin coaxial cable terminated with BNC connectors to build a local area network. Standardized in 1984, it was the dominant 10 Mbit/s Ethernet standard during the mid to late 1980s.

The use of twisted pair networks competed with 10BASE2's use of a single coaxial cable. In 1988, Ethernet over twisted pair was introduced, running at the same speed of 10 Mbit/s. In 1995, the Fast Ethernet standard upgraded the speed to 100 Mbit/s, and no such speed improvement was ever made for thinnet. By 2001, prices for Fast Ethernet cards had fallen to under $50. By 2003, Wi-Fi networking equipment was widely available and affordable.

Due to the immense demand for high-speed networking, the low cost of Category 5 cable, and the popularity of 802.11 wireless networks, both 10BASE2 and 10BASE5 have become increasingly obsolete, though devices still exist in some locations. As of 2011, IEEE 802.3 has deprecated this standard for new installations.

== Name origination ==
The name 10BASE2 is derived from several characteristics of the physical medium. The 10 comes from the transmission speed of 10 Mbit/s. The BASE stands for baseband signaling, and the 2 for a maximum segment length approaching 200 m (the actual maximum length is 185 m).

== Signal encoding ==
10 Mbit/s Ethernet uses Manchester coding. A binary zero is indicated by a low-to-high transition in the middle of the bit period and a binary one is indicated by a high-to-low transition in the middle of the bit period. Manchester coding allows the clock to be recovered from the signal. However, the additional transitions associated with it double the signal bandwidth.

== Network design ==
Schematic of a 10Base2 network segment

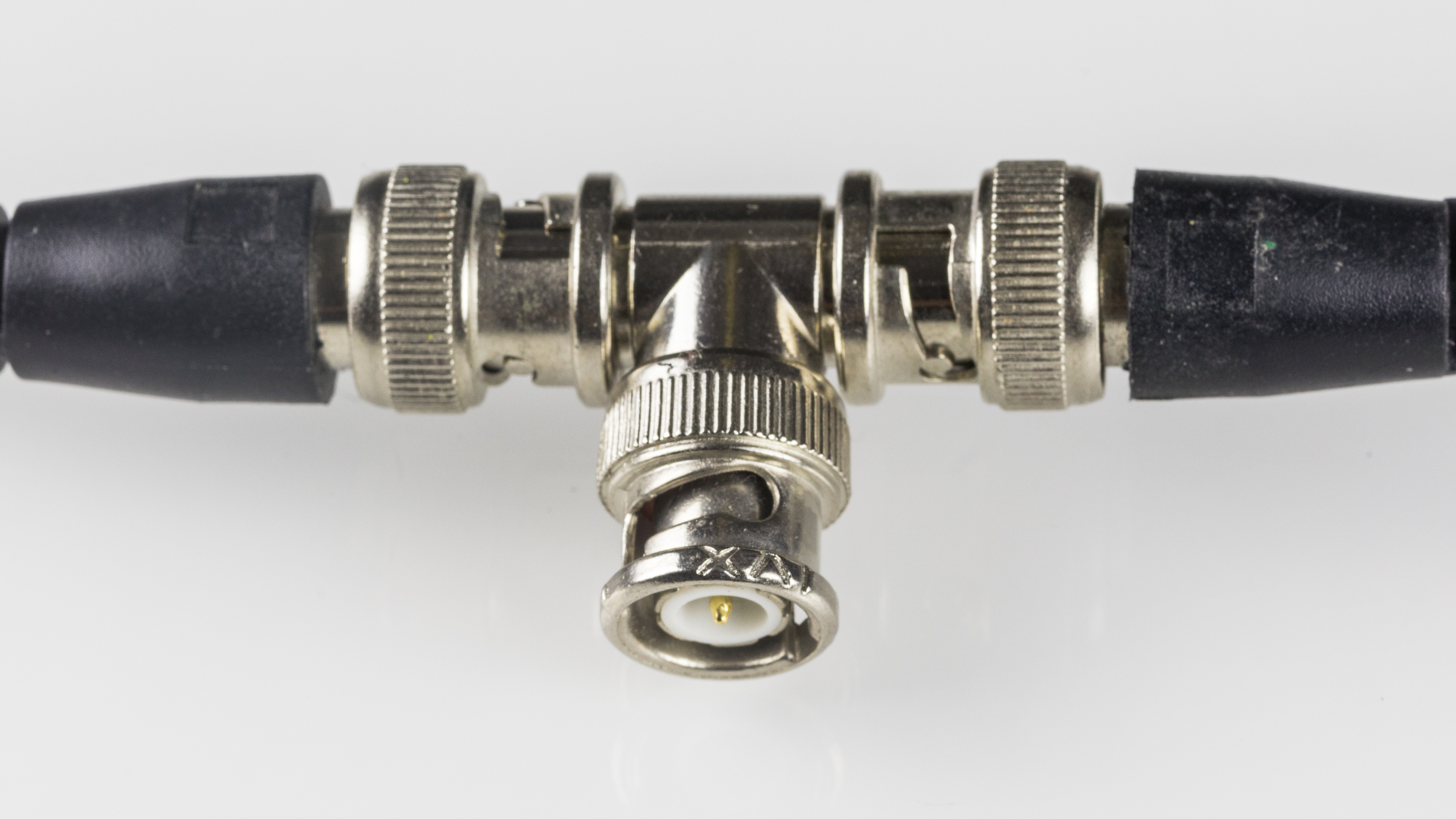
10BASE2 cable with a BNC T-connector

10BASE2 coax cables have a maximum length of 185 metres (607 ft). The maximum practical number of nodes that can be connected to a 10BASE2 segment is limited to 30 with a minimum distance of 0.5 metres (20 in) between devices. In a 10BASE2 network, each stretch of cable is connected to the transceiver (which is usually built into the network adaptor) using a BNC T-connector, (Note: Other connectors such as EAD sockets were promoted as a less error-prone alternative to BNC connectors.) with one stretch connected to each female connector of the T. The T-connector must be plugged directly into the network adaptor with no cable in between.

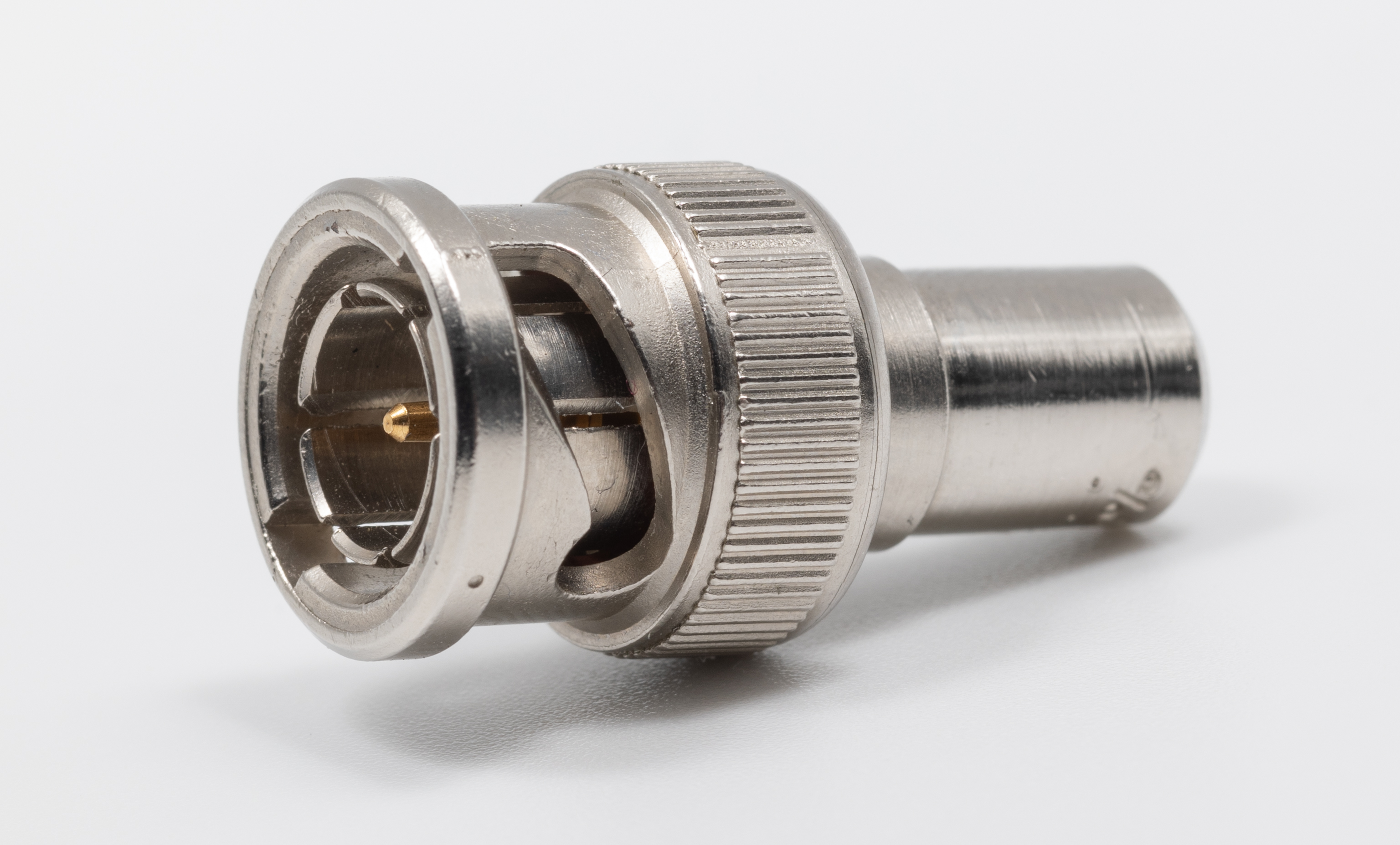
10BASE2 cable end terminator

As is the case with most other high-speed buses, Ethernet segments have to be terminated with a resistor at each end. Each end of the cable has a 50 Ω resistor attached. Typically, this resistor is built into a male BNC and attached to the last device on the bus. This is most commonly connected directly to the T-connector on a workstation. (Note: A few devices such as Digital's DEMPR and DESPR have a built-in terminator and so can only be used at one physical end of the cable run.) If termination is missing, or if there is a break in the cable, the AC signal on the bus is reflected, rather than dissipated, when it reaches the end. This reflected signal is indistinguishable from a collision, so no communication can take place.

Some terminators have a metallic chain attached to them for grounding purposes. The cable should be grounded only at one end. Grounding the terminators at both may produce a ground loop and can cause network outages or data corruption when swells of electricity traverse the coaxial cabling's outer shield.

When wiring a 10BASE2 network, special care has to be taken to ensure that cables are properly connected to all T-connectors. Bad contacts or shorts are especially difficult to diagnose. A failure at any point of the network cabling tends to prevent all communications. For this reason, 10BASE2 networks can be difficult to maintain and were often replaced by 10BASE-T networks, which (provided category 5 cable or better was used) also provided a good upgrade path to 100BASE-TX.

== Comparisons to 10BASE-T ==
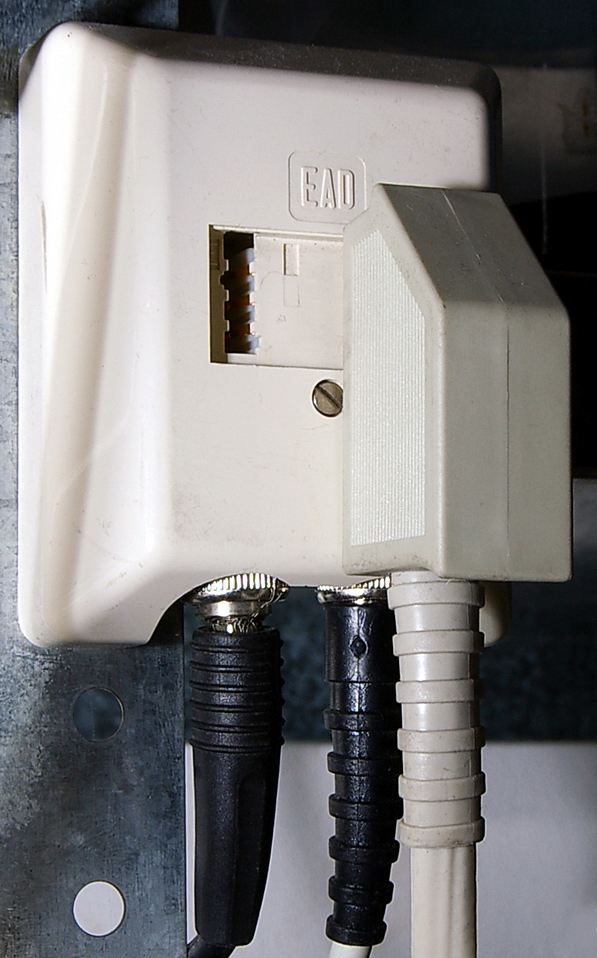
EAD outlet

10BASE2 networks cannot generally be extended without temporarily breaking service for existing users, and the presence of many joints in the cable also makes them very vulnerable to accidental or malicious disruption. There were proprietary systems that claimed to avoid these problems (e.g., EAD sockets), but these never became widespread, possibly due to a lack of standardization. 10BASE-T can be extended by making a new connection to a hub. A fault in one hub connection does not necessarily compromise other connections to the hub.

10BASE2 systems did have a number of advantages over 10BASE-T. No hub is required as with 10BASE-T, so the hardware cost was minimal, and wiring was particularly easy since only a single wire run is needed, which could be sourced from the nearest computer. These characteristics made 10BASE2 ideal for a small network of two or three machines, perhaps in a home where easily concealed wiring was an advantage. For a larger complex office network, the difficulties of tracing poor connections made it impractical. Unfortunately for 10BASE2, by the time multiple home computer networks became common, the format had already been practically superseded by 10BASE-T.

== Comparisons to 10BASE5, use of AUI ==
10BASE2 uses RG-58A/U cable or similar for a maximum segment length of 185 m as opposed to the thicker RG-8-like cable used in 10BASE5 networks with a maximum length of 500 m. The RG-58 type wire used by 10BASE2 was inexpensive, smaller and much more flexible than the specialized RG-8 variant. 10BASE2 can also use RG-59 cable.

An Ethernet network interface controller (NIC) may include the 10BASE2 transceivers and thus directly provide a 10BASE2 BNC connector (that the T-connector plugs into), or it may offer an AUI connector that external transceivers (see Medium Attachment Unit) can connect to. These can be transceivers for 10BASE2, but also for 10BASE5 or 10BASE-T. Some NICs offer both BNC and AUI connectors, or other combinations including BNC and 10BASE-T. With multiple connections, only one connector is designed to be used at the same time.

== See also ==
- List of early Ethernet standards
- List of network buses
