= 10BASE5 =

First commercially available variant of Ethernet

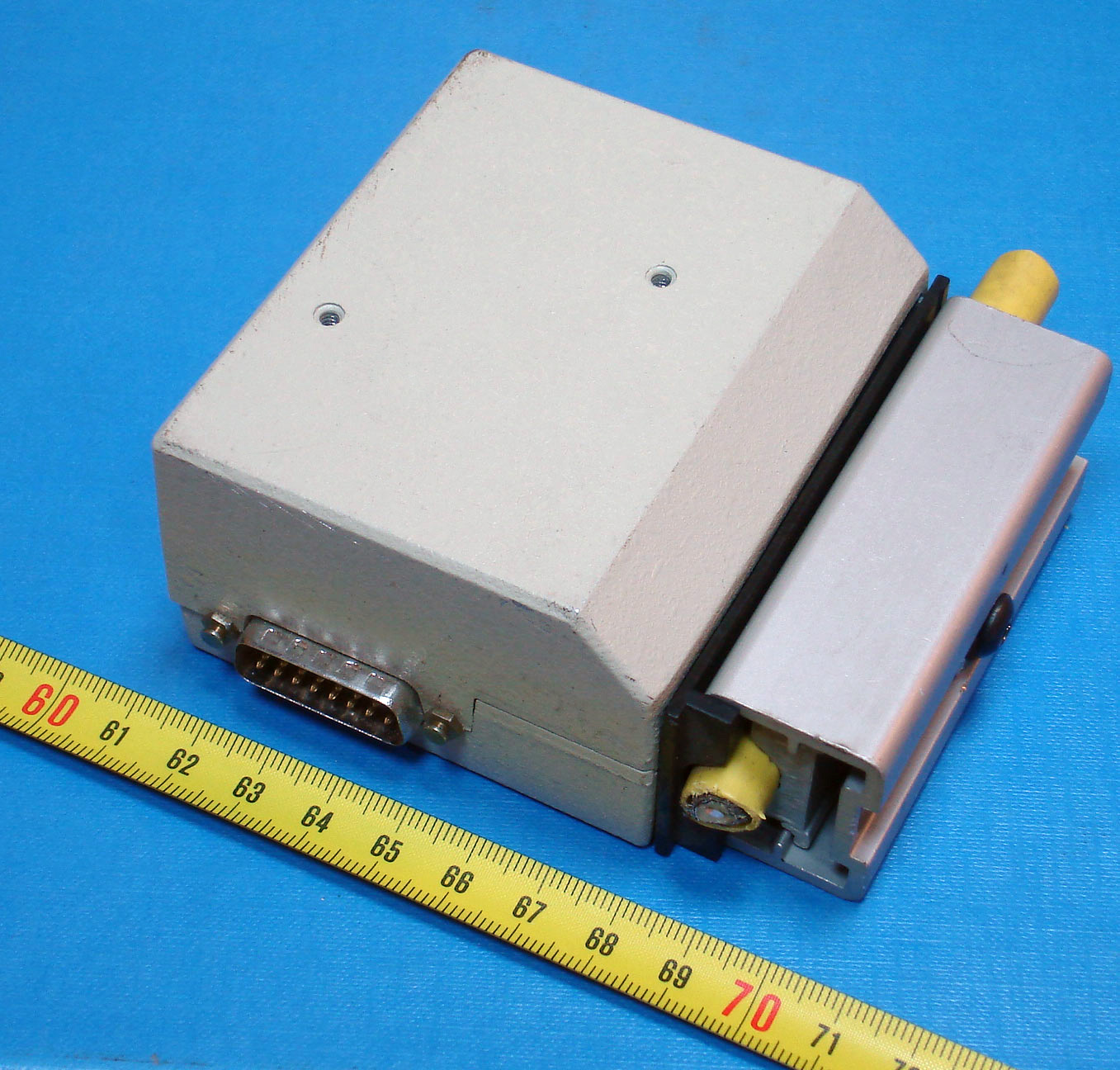
10BASE5 vampire tap Medium Attachment Unit (transceiver)

10BASE5 (also known as thick Ethernet or thicknet) is a version of Ethernet providing 10 Mbit/s bandwidth over a thick coaxial cable having a maximum length of 500 m (1,600 ft). It was the first commercially available version of Ethernet. The technology was standardized first by Ecma International in early 1982 based on an IEEE draft standard, then by IEEE in 1983 as IEEE 802.3. Up to 100 stations can be connected to the cable in a single collision domain. The standard specifies CSMA/CD to resolve collisions.

10BASE5 was superseded by much cheaper and more convenient alternatives: first by 10BASE2 based on a thinner coaxial cable (1985), and then, once Ethernet over twisted pair was developed, by 10BASE-T (1990) and its successors 100BASE-TX and 1000BASE-T. In 2003, the IEEE 802.3 working group deprecated 10BASE5 for new installations.

== Name origination ==
The name 10BASE5 is derived from several characteristics of the physical medium. The 10 refers to its transmission speed of 10 Mbit/s. The BASE is short for baseband signaling (as opposed to broadband (Note: The choice for broadband as the opposite is exemplified by Ethernet standards such as 10BROAD36. Later, the term broadband came to be used more commonly for different concepts, and the terms passband or modulated would be used to describe non-baseband signaling.)), and the 5 stands for the maximum segment length of 500 meters (1,600 ft).

== The physical layer ==
=== Cabling and Connectors ===
Schematic of a 10Base5 network segment

For its physical layer, 10BASE5 uses cable similar to RG-8/U coaxial cable but with extra braided shield. This is a stiff, 0.4-inch (10 mm) diameter cable with an impedance of 50 ohms, a solid center conductor, a foam insulating filler, a shielding braid, and an outer jacket. The outer jacket is often yellow-to-orange fluorinated ethylene propylene (for fire resistance) so it often is called yellow cable, orange hose, or sometimes humorously frozen yellow garden hose. 10BASE5 coaxial cables had a maximum length of 500 meters (1,600 ft). Up to 100 nodes could be connected to a 10BASE5 segment.

Transceiver nodes can be connected to cable segments with N connectors, or via a vampire tap, which allows new nodes to be added while existing connections are live. A vampire tap clamps onto the cable, a hole is drilled through the outer shielding, and a spike is forced to pierce the outer three layers and contact the inner conductor while other spikes bite into the outer braided shield. Care is required to keep the outer shield from touching the spike; installation kits include a coring tool to drill through the outer layers and a braid pick to clear stray pieces of the outer shield.

Transceivers should be installed only at precise 2.5-meter intervals. This distance was chosen to not correspond to the signal's wavelength; this ensures that the reflections from multiple taps are not in phase. These suitable points are marked on the cable with black bands. The cable is required to be one continuous run; T-connections are not allowed.

=== Electrical Termination ===
As is the case with most other high-speed buses, segments must be terminated at each end. For coaxial-cable-based Ethernet, each end of the cable has a 50 ohm resistor attached. Typically, this resistor is built into a male N connector and attached to the cable's end just past the last device. With termination missing, or if there is a break in the cable, the signal on the bus will be reflected, rather than dissipated when it reaches the end. This reflected signal is indistinguishable from a collision and prevents communication.

== Disadvantages ==
Stations are connected to the cable using vampire taps. This complicates adding new stations to the network because of the need to pierce the cable accurately. The cable is stiff and difficult to bend around corners. One improper connection can take down the whole network and finding the source of the trouble is difficult.

This type of network was potentially more expensive to install and maintain than networks based on twisted pair cabling, since the latter might have already been present in sufficient quality as the phone network in office buildings.

== See also ==
- List of early Ethernet standards
- EAD-socket
