= Electrical termination =

Transmission line impedance matching

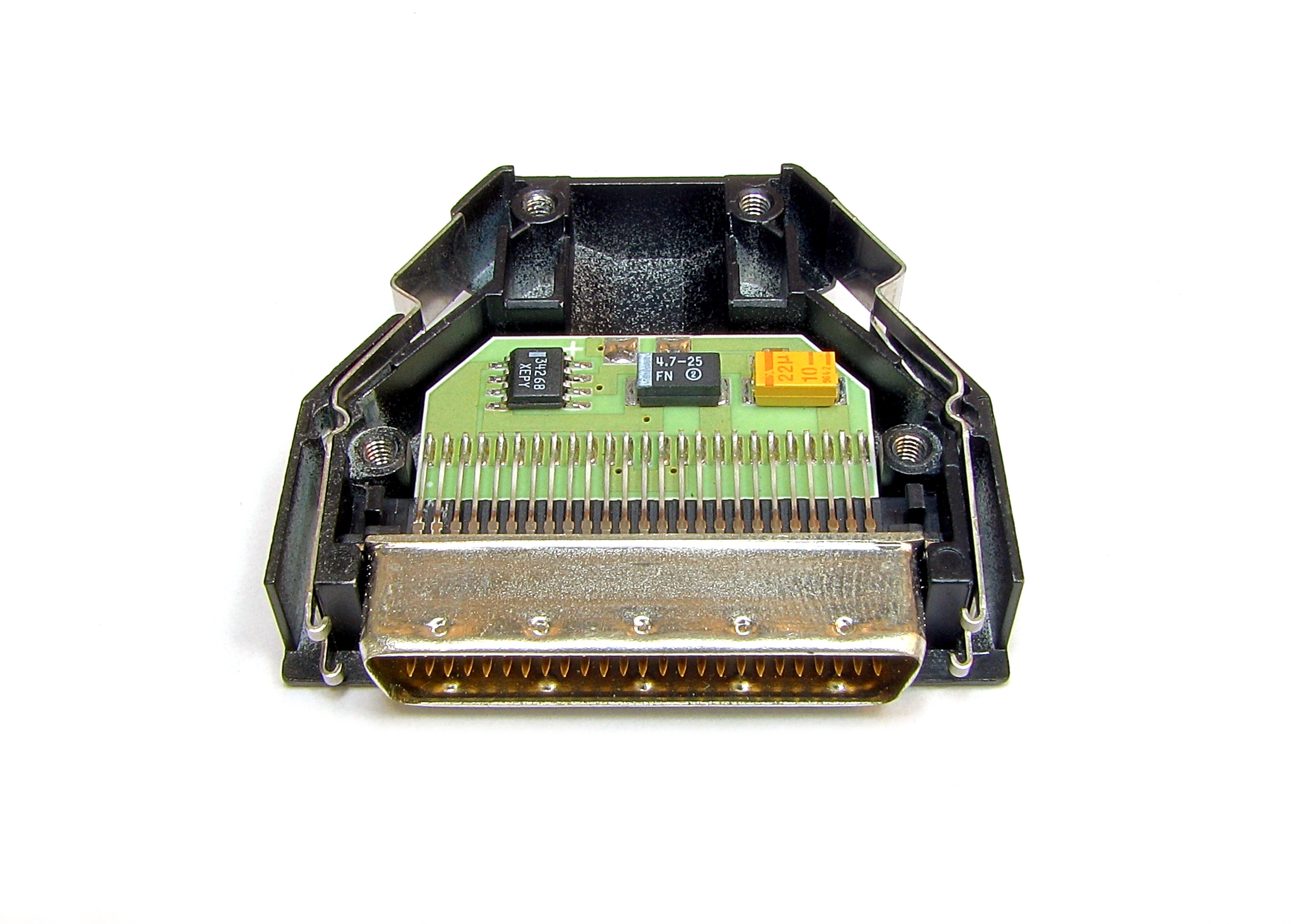
SCSI terminator opened to expose internal circuits

In electronics, electrical termination is the practice of ending a transmission line with a device that matches the characteristic impedance of the line. Signal reflections occur where there is an impedance mismatch. Termination prevents signals from reflecting off the end of the transmission line. Reflections at the ends of unterminated transmission lines cause distortion, which can produce ambiguous digital signal levels and misoperation of digital systems. Reflections in analog signal systems cause such effects as video ghosting, or power loss in radio transmitter transmission lines.

== Transmission lines ==
Signal termination often requires the installation of a terminator at the beginning and end of a wire or cable to prevent an RF signal from being reflected back from each end, causing interference, or power loss. The terminator is usually placed at the end of a transmission line or daisy chain bus (such as in SCSI), and is designed to match the AC impedance of the cable and hence minimize signal reflections, and power losses. Less commonly, a terminator is also placed at the driving end of the wire or cable, if not already part of the signal-generating equipment.

Radio frequency currents tend to reflect from discontinuities in the cable, such as connectors and joints, and travel back down the cable toward the source, causing interference as primary reflections. Secondary reflections can also occur at the cable starts, allowing interference to persist as repeated echoes of old data. These reflections also act as bottlenecks, preventing the signal power from reaching the destination.

Transmission line cables require impedance matching to carry electromagnetic signals with minimal reflections and power losses. The distinguishing feature of most transmission line cables is that they have uniform cross-sectional dimensions along their length, giving them a uniform electrical characteristic impedance. Signal terminators are designed to specifically match the characteristic impedances at both cable ends. For many systems, the terminator is a resistor, with a value chosen to match the characteristic impedance of the transmission line and chosen to have acceptably low parasitic inductance and capacitance at the frequencies relevant to the system. Examples include 75-ohm resistors often used to terminate 75-ohm video transmission coaxial cables.

Types of transmission line cables include balanced line such as ladder line, and twisted pairs (Cat-6 Ethernet, Parallel SCSI, ADSL, Landline Phone, XLR audio, USB, Firewire, Serial); and unbalanced lines such as coaxial cable (Radio antenna, CATV, 10BASE5 Ethernet).

== Types of electrical and signal terminators ==
=== Passive ===
Passive terminators often consist of a single resistor; however, significantly reactive loads may require other passive components such as inductors, capacitors, or transformers.

=== Active ===
Active terminators consist of a voltage regulator that keeps the voltage used for the terminating resistor(s) at a constant level.

==== Forced perfect termination ====
Forced perfect termination

Forced perfect termination (FPT) can be used on single-ended buses where diodes remove over and undershoot conditions. The signal is locked between two actively regulated voltage levels, which results in superior performance over a standard active terminator.

== Signal termination applications ==
=== SCSI ===
All parallel SCSI units use terminators. SCSI is primarily used for storage and backup. An active terminator is a type of single-ended SCSI terminator with a built-in voltage regulator to compensate for variations in terminator power.

=== Controller Area Network ===
Controller area network, commonly known as CAN Bus, uses terminators consisting of a 120 ohm resistor.

=== Dummy load ===
Dummy loads are commonly used in HF to EHF circuits.

=== Ethernet coaxial 50 ohm ===
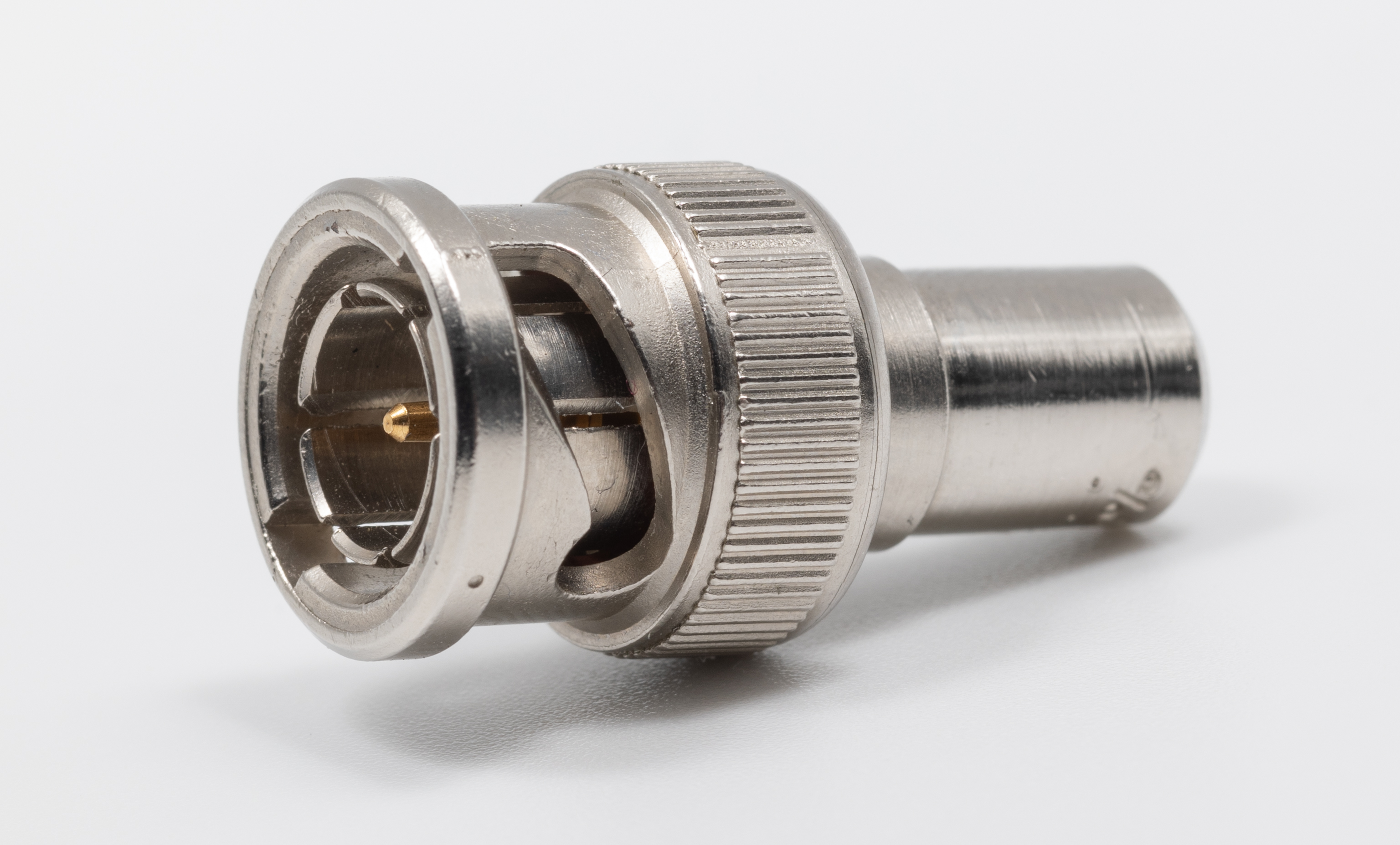
10BASE2 cable-end signal terminator

10BASE2 networks absolutely must have proper termination with a 50-ohm BNC terminator. If the bus network is not properly terminated, too much power will be reflected, causing all of the computers on the bus to lose network connectivity.

=== Antenna network 75 ohm ===
A terminating resistor for a television coaxial cable is often in the form of a cap, threaded to screw onto an F connector. Antenna cables are sometimes used for internet connections; however, RG-6 should not be used for 10BASE2 (which should use RG-58) as the impedance mismatch can cause phasing problems with the baseband signal.

=== Unibus ===
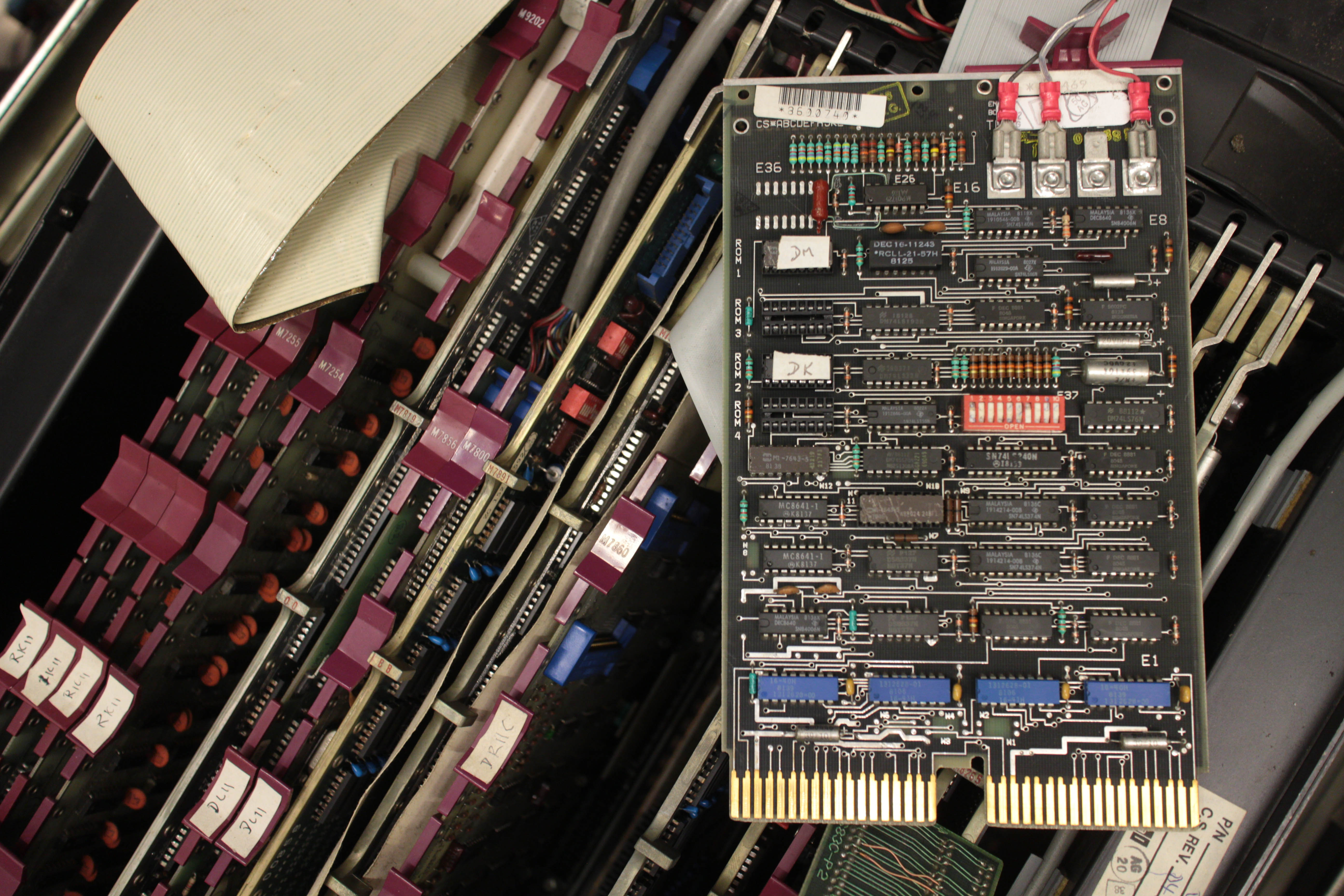
Unibus terminator-and-bootstrap card from a PDP-11/34

The Digital Equipment Corporation minicomputer Unibus systems used terminator cards with 178 Ω pull-up resistors on the multi-drop address and data lines and 383 Ω on the single-drop signal lines.

=== MIL-STD-1553 ===
Terminating resistor values of 78.7 ohms, 2 watt, 1% are used on the MIL-STD-1553 bus. At the two ends of the bus, resistors connect between the positive (high) and negative (low) signal wires either in internally terminated bus couplers or external connectorized terminators.

The MIL-STD-1553B bus must be terminated at both ends to minimize the effects of signal reflections that can cause waveform distortion and disruption or intermittent communications failures.

Optionally, a high-impedance terminator (1000 to 3000 ohms) may be used in vehicle applications to simulate a future load from an unspecified device.

Connectorized terminators are available with or without safety chains.

== See also ==
- Electrical connector
- Electrical network
- MIL-STD-1553
- Telecommunications pedestal
