= Ethernet physical layer =

Electrical or optical properties between network devices

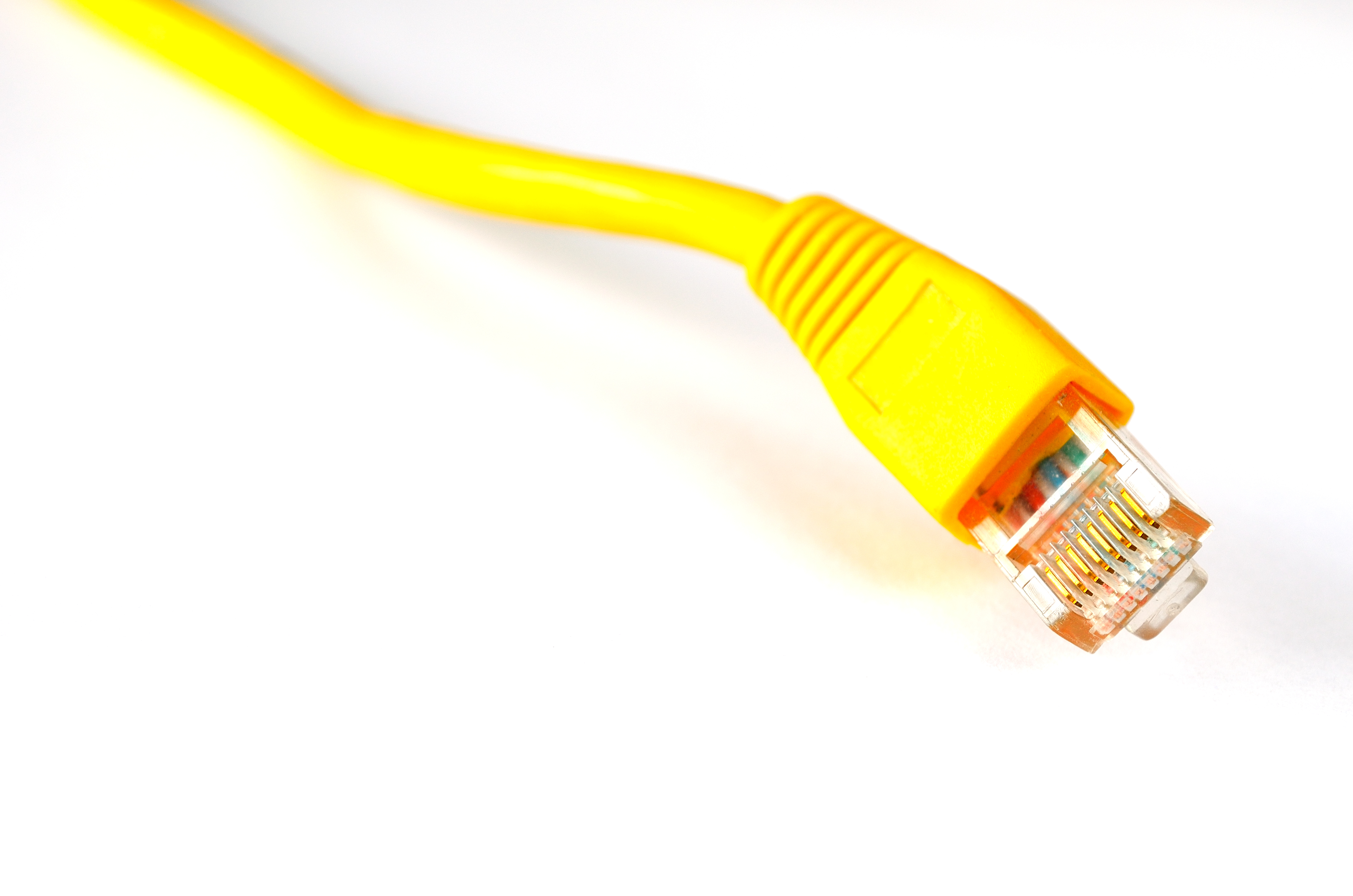
- A standard 8P8C (often called RJ45) connector used most commonly on category 5 cable, one of the types of cabling used in Ethernet networks
- Standard: IEEE 802.3 (1983 onwards)
- Physical media: Twisted pair, optical fiber, coaxial cable
- Network topology: Point-to-point, star, bus
- Major variants: 10BASE5, 10BASE2, 10BASE-T, 100BASE-TX, 1000BASE-T, 10GBASE-R
- Maximum distance: 100 m (328 ft) over twisted pair, up to 100 km over optical fiber
- Mode of operation: optical, differential (balanced), single-ended
- Maximum bit rate: 1 Mbit/s to 800 Gbit/s
- Voltage levels: ± 2.5 V (over twisted pair)
- Common connector types: 8P8C, LC, SC, ST, MPO

The physical-layer specifications of the Ethernet family of computer network standards are published by the Institute of Electrical and Electronics Engineers (IEEE), which defines the electrical or optical properties and the transfer speed of the physical connection between a device and the network or between network devices. It is complemented by the MAC layer and the logical link layer. An implementation of a specific physical layer is commonly referred to as PHY.

The Ethernet physical layer has evolved over its existence starting in 1980 and encompasses multiple physical media interfaces and several orders of magnitude of speed from 1 Mbit/s to 800 Gbit/s. The physical medium ranges from bulky coaxial cable to twisted pair and optical fiber with a standardized reach of up to 80 km. In general, network protocol stack software will work similarly on all physical layers.

Many Ethernet adapters and switch ports support multiple speeds by using autonegotiation to set the speed and duplex for the best values supported by both connected devices. If autonegotiation fails, some multiple-speed devices sense the speed used by their partner, but this may result in a duplex mismatch. With rare exceptions, a 100BASE-TX port (10/100) also supports 10BASE-T while a 1000BASE-T port (10/100/1000) also supports 10BASE-T and 100BASE-TX. Most 10GBASE-T ports also support 1000BASE-T, some even 100BASE-TX or 10BASE-T. While autonegotiation can practically be relied on for Ethernet over twisted pair, few optical-fiber ports support multiple speeds. In any case, even multi-rate fiber interfaces only support a single wavelength (e.g. 850 nm for 1000BASE-SX or 10GBASE-SR).

10 Gigabit Ethernet was already used in both enterprise and carrier networks by 2007, with 40 Gbit/s and 100 Gigabit Ethernet ratified. In 2024, the fastest additions to the Ethernet family were 800 Gbit/s variants.

== Naming conventions ==
Generally, layers are named by their specifications:

- 10, 100, 1000, 10G, ... – the nominal, usable speed at the top of the physical layer (no suffix = megabit/s, G = gigabit/s), excluding line codes but including other physical layer overhead (preamble, SFD, IPG); some WAN PHYs (W) run at slightly reduced bitrates for compatibility reasons; encoded PHY sublayers usually run at higher bitrates
- BASE, BROAD, PASS – indicates baseband, broadband, or passband signaling respectively
- -T, -T1, -S, -L, -E, -Z, -C, -K, -H ... – medium (PMD): T = twisted pair, -T1 = single-pair twisted pair, S = 850 nm short wavelength (multi-mode fiber), L = 1300 nm long wavelength (mostly single-mode fiber), E or Z = 1500 nm extra long wavelength (single-mode), B = bidirectional fiber (mostly single-mode) using WDM, P = passive optical (PON), C = copper/twinax, K = backplane, 2 or 5 or 36 = coax with 185/500/3600 m reach (obsolete), F = fiber, various wavelengths, H = plastic optical fiber
- X, R – PCS encoding method (varying with the generation): X for 8b/10b block encoding (4B5B for Fast Ethernet), R for large block encoding (64b/66b)
- 1, 2, 4, 10 – for LAN PHYs indicates number of lanes used per link; for WAN PHYs indicates reach in kilometers

For 10 Mbit/s, no encoding is indicated as all variants use Manchester code. Most twisted pair layers use unique encoding, so most often just -T is used.

The reach, especially for optical connections, is defined as the maximum achievable link length that is guaranteed to work when all channel parameters are met (modal bandwidth, attenuation, insertion losses etc.). With better channel parameters, often a longer, stable link length can be achieved. Vice versa, a link with worse channel parameters can also work but only over a shorter distance. Reach and maximum distance have the same meaning.

== Physical layers ==
The following sections provide a brief summary of official Ethernet media types. In addition to these official standards, many vendors have implemented proprietary media types for various reasons—often to support longer distances over fiber optic cabling.

=== Early implementations and 10 Mbit/s ===
Early Ethernet standards used Manchester coding so that the signal was self-clocking and not adversely affected by high-pass filters.

Name	Standard (Clause)	Common connectors	Link reach	Required cable	Description
Coaxial cable
Xerox experimental Ethernet	Proprietary (1976)	Vampire tap	1 km	75 Ω coaxial	The original 2.94 Mbit/s Ethernet implementation had eight-bit addresses and other differences in frame format.
10BASE5	802.3-1985 (8)	AUI, N, vampire tap	500 m	RG-8/U	Original standard uses a single coaxial cable in which a connection is made by tapping into the single cable, drilling in to make contact with the core and the screen. Widespread deployment in the early 1980s. Was known also as DIX Standard (pre 802.3) and later as Thick-Ethernet (in contrast to 10BASE2, thinnet). 10 Mbit/s over expensive RG-8/U 50 Ω coaxial cabling, electrical bus topology with collision detection. Deprecated 2003.
10BASE2	802.3a-1985 (10)	BNC, EAD/TAE-E	185 m	RG-58	50 Ω coaxial cable connects machines together, each machine using a T-connector to connect to its NIC. Requires terminators at each end. For many years during the mid to late 1980, this was the dominant Ethernet standard. Also called Thin Ethernet, Thinnet or Cheapernet. 10 Mbit/s over RG-58 coaxial cabling, bus topology with collision detection. Deprecated 2011.
10BROAD36	802.3b-1985 (11)	F	1800 m @VF0.87	75 Ω coaxial	An early standard supporting Ethernet over longer distances. It utilized broadband modulation techniques, similar to those employed in cable modem systems, and operated over coaxial cable. 10 Mbit/s, scrambled NRZ signaling modulated (PSK) over high-frequency carrier, broad bandwidth coaxial cabling, bus topology with collision detection. Deprecated 2003.
Twisted-pair cable
1BASE5	802.3e-1987 (12)	8P8C (IEC 60603-7)	250 m	voice-grade	Also called StarLAN. Operated at 1 Mbit/s over twisted pair to an active hub, star topology. Although a commercial failure, 1BASE5 pioneered the use of twisted-pair cabling and defined the architecture for all subsequent Ethernet evolution on that medium. Deprecated 2003.
StarLAN 10	Proprietary (1988)	8P8C	100 m	voice-grade	10 Mbit/s over copper twisted pair cabling, star topology – evolved into 10BASE-T
LattisNet UTP	Proprietary (1987)	8P8C	100 m	voice-grade	10 Mbit/s over copper twisted pair cabling, star topology – evolved into 10BASE-T
10BASE-T	802.3i-1990 (14)	8P8C (IEC 60603-7)	100 m	Cat-3	Runs over four wires (two twisted pairs). A repeater hub or switch sits in the middle and has a port for each node. This is also the configuration used for 100BASE-T. Copper twisted pair cabling, star topology – direct evolution of 1BASE-5. As of 2024, still widely supported.
10BASE-Te	802.3az-2010 (14)	8P8C (IEC 60603-7)	100 m	Cat-5	Energy-Efficient Ethernet variant of 10BASE-T using a reduced amplitude signal over Category 5 cable, completely interoperable with 10BASE-T nodes.
10BASE-T1L	802.3cg-2019 (146)	IEC 63171-1, IEC 63171-6	1000 m		Ethernet over a single twisted pair - long reach, for industrial applications
10BASE-T1S	802.3cg-2019 (147)	IEC 63171-1, IEC 63171-6	25 m		Ethernet over a single twisted pair - short reach, for automotive applications with shared medium support, including PoDL
10BASE-T1M	802.3da-2026 (188)	IEC 63171-1, IEC 63171-6	50 m		Ethernet over a single twisted pair - medium reach, for automotive applications with shared medium support, including PoDL
Fiber-optical cable
FOIRL	802.3d-1987 (9.9)	ST	1000 m	FDDI-style MMF	Fiber-optic inter-repeater link; the original standard for Ethernet over fiber, superseded by 10BASE-FL, deprecated 2011
10BASE-F	802.3j-1993 (15)				A generic term for the family of 10 Mbit/s Ethernet standards using fiber optic cable: 10BASE-FL, 10BASE-FB and 10BASE-FP. Of these only 10BASE-FL gained widespread use. 10 Mbit/s over fiber pair
10BASE-FL	802.3j-1993 (15&18)	ST	2000 m	FDDI-style MMF	An updated version of the FOIRL standard for end nodes, 2 km reach over FDDI-style multi-mode fiber, 850 nm wavelength
10BASE-FB	802.3j-1993 (15&17)	ST	2000 m	FDDI-style MMF	Intended for backbones connecting a number of hubs or switches as a direct successor to FOIRL; deprecated 2011.
10BASE‑FP	802.3j-1993 (15&16)	ST	1000 m	FDDI-style MMF	A passive star network that required no repeater, it was never implemented. Deprecated 2003.

=== 100 Mbit/s ===
All Fast Ethernet variants use a star topology and generally use 4B5B line coding.

Name	Standard (Clause)	Common connectors	Description
Twisted-pair cable
100BASE‑T	802.3u-1995 (21)		A term for any of the three standards for 100 Mbit/s Ethernet over twisted pair cable. Includes 100BASE-TX, 100BASE-T4 and 100BASE-T2. As of 2009, 100BASE-TX has totally dominated the market, and may be considered synonymous with 100BASE-T in informal usage.
100BASE-TX	802.3u-1995 (24, 25)	8P8C (FDDI TP-PMD standard, ANSI INCITS 263-1995)	4B5B MLT-3 coded signaling, Category 5 cable using two twisted pairs. The specifications are largely borrowed from FDDI's TP-PMD. As of 2018, still very popular.
100BASE-T4	802.3u-1995 (23)	8P8C (IEC 60603-7)	8B6T PAM-3 coded signaling, Category 3 cable (as used for 10BASE-T installations) using four twisted pairs. Limited to half-duplex. Deprecated 2003.
100BASE-T2	802.3y-1998 (32)	8P8C (IEC 60603-7)	PAM-5 coded signaling, CAT3 copper cabling with two twisted pairs, star topology. Supports full-duplex. It is functionally equivalent to 100BASE-TX, but supports old telephone cable. However, special sophisticated digital signal processors are required to handle the encoding schemes it uses, making this option fairly expensive at the time. It arrived well after 100BASE-TX was established in the market. 100BASE-T2 and 100BASE-T4 were not widely adopted but some of the technology developed for them is used in 1000BASE-T. Deprecated 2003.
100BASE-T1	802.3bw-2015 (96)	none specified	Uses PAM-3 modulation at 66.7 MBd over a single, bi-directional twisted pair of up to 15 m; three bits are encoded as two ternary symbols. It is intended for automotive applications.
100BaseVG	802.12-1994	8P8C	Standardized by a different IEEE 802 subgroup, 802.12, because it used a different, more centralized form of media access (demand priority). Proposed by Hewlett-Packard. Inherently half-duplex, it needed four pairs in a Cat-3 cable. Now obsolete, the standard has been withdrawn in 2001.
HDMI Ethernet Channel	HDMI 1.4 (2009)	HDMI	HEC uses a hybrid to mix and separate 100BASE-TX's transmit and receive signals through a single twisted pair.
Fiber-optical cable
100BASE‑FX	802.3u-1995 (24, 26)	ST, SC	4B5B NRZI coded signaling, two strands of multi-mode optical fiber using 1300 nm wavelength. Maximum length is 400 meters for half-duplex connections (to ensure collisions are detected) or 2 kilometers for full-duplex. The specifications are largely borrowed from FDDI.
100BASE‑SX	TIA-785 (2000)	ST, SC	100 Mbit/s Ethernet over multi-mode fiber. Maximum length is 300 meters. 100BASE-SX used short wavelength (850 nm) optics that was sharable with 10BASE-FL, thus making an autonegotiation scheme possible with 10/100 fiber adapters.
100BASE‑BX10	802.3ah-2004 (58, 66)	ST, SC, LC	100 Mbit/s Ethernet bidirectionally over a single strand of single-mode optical fiber. An optical multiplexer is used to split transmit and receive signals into different wavelengths (1530 and 1310 nm) allowing them to share the same fiber. Supports up to 10 km, full-duplex only.
100BASE-LX10	802.3ah-2004 (58)	ST, SC, LC	100 Mbit/s Ethernet up to 10 km over a pair of single-mode fibers, using 1310 wavelength, full-duplex only.

=== 1 Gbit/s ===
All Gigabit Ethernet variants use a star topology. 1000BASE-X variants use 8b/10b PCS encoding. Initially, half-duplex mode was included in the standard but has since been abandoned. Very few devices support gigabit speed in half-duplex.

Name	Standard (Clause)	Common connectors	Description
Twisted-pair cable
1000BASE-T	802.3ab-1999 (40)	8P8C (IEC 60603-7)	PAM-5 coded signaling, at least Category 5 cable, with Category 5e strongly recommended copper cabling with four twisted pairs. Each pair is used in both directions simultaneously. Extremely wide adoption.
1000BASE-T1	802.3bp-2016 (97)	none specified	Uses a single, bi-directional twisted pair in full duplex mode only; cables specified for a reach of 15 m (automotive link segment) or 40 m (optional link segment), intended for automotive and industrial applications; it uses 80B/81B encoding in the PCS, PAM-3 signalling at 750 MBd (three bits transmitted as two ternary symbols) and includes Reed–Solomon error correction.
1000BASE-TX	TIA-854 (2001)	8P8C (IEC 60603-7)	Category 6 cable required. Unimplemented, withdrawn.
Fiber-optic cable
1000BASE-SX	802.3z-1998 (38)	ST, SC, LC	8b/10b NRZ coded signaling on 850 nm carrier, short-range multi-mode fiber (up to 550 m).
1000BASE-LX	802.3z-1998 (38)	SC, LC	8b/10b NRZ coded signaling on 1310 nm carrier, multi-mode fiber (up to 550 m) or single-mode fiber of up to 5 km; most current implementations are actually 1000BASE-LX10 with 10 km reach
1000BASE-BX10	802.3ah-2004 (59)	SC, LC	up to 10 km on 1490 and 1310 nm carriers; bidirectional over single strand of single-mode fiber; often called just 1000BASE-BX
1000BASE-LX10	802.3ah-2004 (59)	SC, LC	identical to 1000BASE-LX but increased power and sensitivity for up to 10 km over a pair of single-mode fiber; commonly called just 1000BASE-LX or, prior to 802.3ah, 1000BASE-LH; vendor-specific extensions exist for up to 40 km reach
1000BASE‑PX10‑D	802.3ah-2004 (60)	SC, LC	downstream (from head-end to tail-ends) over single-mode fiber using point-to-multipoint topology (supports at least 10 km).
1000BASE‑PX10‑U	802.3ah-2004 (60)	SC, LC	upstream (from a tail-end to the head-end) over single-mode fiber using point-to-multipoint topology (supports at least 10 km).
1000BASE‑PX20‑D	802.3ah-2004 (60)	SC, LC	downstream (from head-end to tail-ends) over single-mode fiber using point-to-multipoint topology (supports at least 20 km).
1000BASE‑PX20‑U	802.3ah-2004 (60)	SC, LC	upstream (from a tail-end to the head-end) over single-mode fiber using point-to-multipoint topology (supports at least 20 km).
1000BASE-EX; 1000BASE-ZX	multi-vendor	SC, LC	up to 40 or 100 km over single-mode fiber on 1550 nm carrier
Other
SFP	INF-8074i (2001)	SFP	not a complete PHY in its own right but highly popular for adding modular transceivers; single lane, usually 1.25 Gbit/s
1000BASE-CX	802.3z-1998 (39)	DE-9, FC style-2/IEC 61076-3-103, CX4/SFF-8470	8b/10b NRZ coded signaling over up to 25 m shielded, balanced copper cable (150 Ω). Predates 1000BASE-T and is rarely used.
1000BASE‑KX	802.3ap-2007 (70)		1 m over backplane
1000BASE-RHA; 1000BASE-RHB; 1000BASE-RHC	802.3bv-2017 (115)	RHA: clamping fixture RHB/RHC: none specified	1000BASE-RHA, -RHB, -RHC run over up to 50, 40, and 15 m of duplex plastic optical fiber (POF) using ~650 nm wavelength, 64b/65b encoding, and PAM16 symbols at 325 MBd; intended for home, industrial and automotive use, respectively

=== 2.5 and 5 Gbit/s ===
2.5GBASE-T and 5GBASE-T are scaled-down variants of 10GBASE-T and provide longer reach over pre-Cat 6A cabling. These physical layers support twisted-pair copper cabling and backplanes only.

Name	Standard (Clause)	Common connectors	Description
Twisted-pair cable
2.5GBASE-T	802.3bz-2016 (126)	8P8C – IEC 60603-7-4 (unscreened) or IEC 60603-7-5 (screened)	100 m of Cat 5e
5GBASE-T	802.3bz-2016 (126)	8P8C – IEC 60603-7-4 (unscreened) or IEC 60603-7-5 (screened)	100 m of Cat 6
2.5GBASE-T1	802.3ch-2020 (149)		use a single, bi-directional twisted pair in full duplex mode only, intended for automotive and industrial applications
5GBASE-T1	802.3ch-2020 (149)		use a single, bi-directional twisted pair in full duplex mode only, intended for automotive and industrial applications
Fiber-optical cable
2.5GBASE-AU	802.3cz-2023 (166)	undefined	up to 40 m of OM3 for automotive
5GBASE-AU	802.3cz-2023 (166)	undefined	up to 40 m of OM3 for automotive
Other
2.5GBASE-KX	802.3cb-2018 (128)		2.5 Gbit/s over 1 m of backplane, upscaled 1000BASE-KX
5GBASE-KR	802.3cb-2018 (130)		5 Gbit/s over 1 m of backplane, downscaled 10GBASE-KR

=== 10 Gbit/s ===
10 Gigabit Ethernet is a version of Ethernet with a nominal data rate of 10 Gbit/s, ten times as fast as Gigabit Ethernet. The first 10 Gigabit Ethernet standard, IEEE Std 802.3ae-2002, was published in 2002. Subsequent standards encompass media types for single-mode fiber (long haul), multi-mode fiber (up to 400 m), copper backplane (up to 1 m) and copper twisted pair (up to 100 m). All 10-gigabit standards were consolidated into IEEE Std 802.3-2008. Most 10-gigabit variants use 64b/66b PCS code (-R). 10 Gigabit Ethernet, specifically 10GBASE-LR and 10GBASE-ER, enjoys significant market shares in carrier networks.

Name	Standard (Clause)	Common connectors	Description
Twisted-pair cable
10GBASE-T	802.3an-2006 (55)	8P8C (IEC 60603-7-4 (unscreened) or IEC 60603-7-5 (screened))	Uses Cat 6A twisted-pair wiring, four lanes at 800 MBd each, PAM-16 with DSQ128 line code
10GBASE-T1	802.3ch-2020 (149)		Uses a single, bi-directional twisted pair in full duplex mode only, intended for automotive and industrial applications
Fiber-optical cable
10GBASE-SR	802.3ae-2002 (52)	SC, LC	Designed to support short distances over deployed multi-mode fiber cabling using 850 nm wavelength; it has a range of between 26 m and 400 m depending on cable type (modal bandwidth:reach: 160 MHz·km(FDDI):26 m, 200 MHz·km(OM1):33 m, 400 MHz·km:66 m, 500 MHz·km(OM2):82 m, 2000 MHz·km(>OM3):300 m, 4700 MHz·km(>OM4):400 m)
10GBASE-LX4	802.3ae-2002 (53)	SC, LC	Uses four 8b/10b lanes with wavelength division multiplexing (1275, 1300, 1325, and 1350 nm) over deployed/legacy multi-mode cabling to support ranges of between 240 m and 300 m (400/500 MHz·km modal bandwidth). Also supports 10 km over single-mode fiber.
10GBASE-LR	802.3ae-2002 (52)	SC, LC	Supports 10 km over single-mode fiber using 1,310 nm wavelength
10GBASE-ER	802.3ae-2002 (52)	SC, LC	Supports 30 km over single-mode fiber using 1,550 nm wavelength (40 km over engineered links)
10GBASE-ZR	Multi-vendor	SC, LC	Offered by various vendors; supports 80 km or more over single-mode fiber using 1,550 nm wavelength
10GBASE-SW	802.3ae-2002 (52)		A variation of 10GBASE-SR with 9.58464 Gbit/s, designed to be mapped directly as OC-192/STM-64 SONET/SDH streams (850 nm wavelength)
10GBASE-LW	802.3ae-2002 (52)		A variation of 10GBASE-LR with 9.58464 Gbit/s, designed to be mapped directly as OC-192/STM-64 SONET/SDH streams (1,310 nm wavelength)
10GBASE-EW	802.3ae-2002 (52)		A variation of 10GBASE-ER with 9.58464 Gbit/s, designed to be mapped directly as OC-192/STM-64 SONET/SDH streams (1,550 nm wavelength)
10GBASE-LRM	802.3aq-2006 (68)	SC, LC	Up to 220 m over deployed 500 MHz·km multi-mode fiber (1,310 nm wavelength)
10GBASE-PR	802.3av-2009 (75)		Providing P2MP 10 Gbit/s Ethernet links over PONs, at the distance of 10 or 20 km.
10GBASE-BR10; 10GBASE-BR20; 10GBASE-BR40	802.3cp-2021 (158)	SC, LC	bidirectional over a single strand of single-mode fiber for up to 10, 20 or 40 km using 1330 (-D; OLT→ONU) and 1270 nm (-U; ONU→OLT) wavelengths; pre-standard variants offered by various vendors, often called 10GBASE-BX or BiDi
10GBASE-AU	802.3cz-2023 (166)	undefined	up to 40 m of OM3 for automotive
Other
10GBASE-CX4	802.3ak-2004 (54)	CX4/SFF-8470/IEC 61076-3-113	Designed to support short distances over copper cabling, it uses InfiniBand 4x connectors and CX4 twinaxial cabling and allows a cable length of up to 15 m. Was specified in IEEE 802.3ak-2004 which has been incorporated into IEEE 802.3-2008. Shipping has all but stopped in favor of 10GBASE-T and SFP+ direct attach.
10GBASE-KX4	802.3ap-2007 (71)		1 m over 4 lanes of backplane
10GBASE-KR	802.3ap-2007 (72)		1 m over a single lane of backplane
10GPASS-XR	802.3bn-2016 (100–102)		EPON Protocol over Coax (EPoC) – up to 10 Gbit/s downstream and 1.6 Gbit/s upstream for a passive optical, point-to-multipoint network using passband OFDM with up to 16384-QAM
SFP+ direct attach	SFF-8431 (2009)	SFP+	Up to 7 m using passive twinaxial cables, up to 15 m using active cables, or up to 100 m using active optical cables (AOC); single lane, usually 10.3125 Gbit/s

=== 25 Gbit/s ===
Single-lane 25-gigabit Ethernet is based on one 25.78125 GBd lane of the four from the 100 Gigabit Ethernet standard developed by the P802.3by task force. 25GBASE-T over twisted pair was approved alongside 40GBASE-T within IEEE 802.3bq.

Name	Standard (Clause)	Common connectors	Description
Twisted-pair cable
25GBASE-T	802.3bq-2016 (113)	8P8C (IEC 60603-7-51 and IEC 60603-7-81, 2000 MHz)	Scaled-down version of 40GBASE-T – up to 30 m Category 8 or ISO/IEC TR 11801-9905 [B1] cabling
Fiber-optical cable
25GBASE-SR	802.3by-2016 (112)	LC, SC	850 nm over multi-mode cabling with 100 m (OM4) or 70 m (OM3) reach
25GBASE-EPON; Nx25-EPON	802.3ca-2020 (141)		Providing P2MP 25 Gbit/s Ethernet links over PONs, at a distance of at least 20 km.
25GBASE-LR	802.3cc-2017 (114)	LC, SC	1310 nm over single-mode cabling with 10 km reach
25GBASE-ER	802.3cc-2017 (114)	LC, SC	1300 nm over single-mode cabling with 30 km reach (40 km over engineered links)
25GBASE-BR10; 25GBASE-BR20; 25GBASE-BR40	802.3cp-2021 (159)	SC, LC	bidirectional over a single strand of single-mode fiber for up to 10, 20 or 40 km using 1330 (-D; OLT→ONU) and 1270 nm (-U; ONU→OLT) wavelengths for -BR10, or 1314/1290 nm wavelengths for -BR20 and -BR40
25GBASE-AU	802.3cz-2023 (166)	undefined	up to 40 m of OM3 for automotive
Other
25GBASE-CR; 25GBASE-CR-S	802.3by-2016 (110)	SFP28 (SFF-8402/SFF-8432)	Direct-attach cable (DAC) over twinaxial cabling with 3 m (-CR-S) and 5 m (-CR-L) reach
25GBASE-KR; 25GBASE-KR-S	802.3by-2016 (111)		For printed-circuit backplane, derived from 100GBASE-KR4
SFP28	SFF-8402 (2014)	SFP28	Popular for adding modular transceivers

=== 40 Gbit/s ===
This class of Ethernet was standardized in June 2010 as IEEE 802.3ba. The work also included the first 100 Gbit/s generation, published in March 2011 as IEEE 802.3bg. A 40 Gbit/s twisted-pair standard was published in 2016 as IEEE 802.3bq-2016.

Name	Standard (Clause)	Common connectors	Description
Twisted-pair cable
40GBASE-T	802.3bq-2016 (113)	8P8C (IEC 60603-7-51 and IEC 60603-7-81, 2000 MHz)	Requires Category 8 cabling, up to 30 m
Fiber-optical cable
40GBASE-SR4	802.3ba-2010 (86)	MPO	At least 100 m over 2000 MHz·km multi-mode fiber (OM3) at least 150 m over 4700 MHz·km multi-mode fiber (OM4)
40GBASE-LR4	802.3ba-2010 (87)	SC, LC	At least 10 km over single-mode fiber, CWDM with 4 lanes using 1270, 1290, 1310 and 1330 nm wavelength
40GBASE-ER4	802.3ba-2010 (87)	SC, LC	At least 30 km over single-mode fiber, CWDM with 4 lanes using 1270, 1290, 1310 and 1330 nm wavelength (40 km over engineered links)
40GBASE-FR	802.3bg-2011 (89)	SC, LC	Single lane, single-mode fiber over 2 km, 1550 nm wavelength
Other
40GBASE-KR4	802.3ba-2010 (84)		At least 1 m over a backplane
40GBASE-CR4	802.3ba-2010 (85)	QSFP+ (SFF-8436)	Up to 7 m over twinaxial copper cable assembly (4 lanes, 10 Gbit/s each)

=== 50 Gbit/s ===
The IEEE 802.3cd task force developed 50 Gbit/s along with next-generation 100 and 200 Gbit/s standards using 50 Gbit/s lanes.

Name	Standard (Clause)	Common connectors	Description
Fiber-optical cable
50GBASE-SR	802.3cd-2018 (138)	LC, SC	100 m over OM4 multi-mode fiber using PAM-4 at 26.5625 GBd, 70 m over OM3
50GBASE-FR	802.3cd-2018 (139)	LC, SC	2 km over single-mode fiber using PAM-4
50GBASE-LR	802.3cd-2018 (139)	LC, SC	10 km over single-mode fiber using PAM-4
50GBASE-ER	802.3cd-2018 (139)	LC, SC	30 km over single-mode fiber using PAM-4, 40 km over engineered links
50GBASE-BR10; 50GBASE-BR20; 50GBASE-BR40	802.3cp-2021 (160)	SC, LC	bidirectional over a single strand of single-mode fiber for up to 10, 20 or 40 km using 1330 (-D; OLT→ONU) and 1270 nm (-U; ONU→OLT) wavelengths for -BR10, or 1314/1290&nm wavelengths for -BR20 and -BR40
50GBASE-AU	802.3cz-2023 (166)	undefined	up to 40 m of OM3 for automotive
Other
50GBASE-CR	802.3cd-2018 (136)	SFP28, QSFP28, microQSFP, QSFP-DD, OSFP	3 m over twinaxial cable
50GBASE-KR	802.3cd-2018 (137)		Printed-circuit backplane, consistent with 802.3bs Clause 124

=== 100 Gbit/s ===
The first generation of 100 Gigabit Ethernet using 10 and 25 Gbit/s lanes was standardized in June 2010 as IEEE 802.3ba alongside 40 Gigabit Ethernet. The second generation using 50 Gbit/s lanes was developed by the IEEE 802.3cd task force along with 50 and 200 Gbit/s standards. The third generation using a single 100 Gbit/s lane was standardized in September 2022 as IEEE 802.3ck along with 200 and 400 Gbit/s Ethernet.

Name	Standard (Clause)	Common connectors	Description
Fiber-optical cable
100GBASE-SR10	802.3ba-2010 (86)	MPO	At least 100 m over 2000 MHz·km multi-mode fiber (OM3), at least 150 m over 4700 MHz·km multi-mode fiber (OM4)
100GBASE-SR4	802.3bm-2015 (95)	MPO	4 lanes, at least 70 m over 2000 MHz·km multi-mode fiber (OM3), at least 100 m over 4700 MHz·km multi-mode fiber (OM4)
100GBASE-SR2	802.3cd-2018 (138)	MPO	Two 50 Gbit/s lanes using PAM-4 at 26.5625 GBd over OM4 multi-mode fiber with 100 m reach, 70 m over OM3, using RS-FEC(544,514) (Clause 91)
100GBASE-LR4	802.3ba-2010 (88)	SC, LC	At least 10 km over single-mode fiber, DWDM with 4 lanes using 1296, 1300, 1305 and 1310 nm wavelength
100GBASE-ER4	802.3ba-2010 (88)	SC, LC	At least 30 km over single-mode fiber, DWDM with 4 lanes using 1296, 1300, 1305 and 1310 nm wavelength (40 km over engineered links)
100GBASE-DR	802.3cu-2021 (140)	LC, SC	At least 500 m over single-mode fiber using a single lane, using RS-FEC and PAM4, 1310 nm wavelength
100GBASE-FR1	802.3cu-2021 (140)	LC, SC	At least 2 km over single-mode fiber using a single lane, using RS-FEC and PAM4, 1310 nm wavelength
100GBASE-LR1	802.3cu-2021 (140)	LC, SC	At least 10 km over single-mode fiber using a single lane, using RS-FEC and PAM4, 1310 nm wavelength
100GBASE-ZR	802.3ct-2021 (153 & 154)	LC, SC	At least 80 km over single-mode fiber using a single wavelength over a DWDM system, also forming the base for 200GBASE-ZR and 400GBASE-ZR
Other
100GBASE-CR10	802.3ba-2010 (85)	CXP10 (SFF-8642)	Up to 7 m over twinaxial copper cable assembly (10 lanes, 10 Gbit/s each)
100GBASE-CR4	802.3bj-2014 (92)	QSFP28 4X (SFF-8665)	Up to 5 m over twinaxial copper cable assembly (4 lanes, 25 Gbit/s each)
100GBASE-CR2	802.3cd-2018 (136)	QSFP28, microQSFP, QSFP-DD, OSFP	Over twinaxial cable with 3 m reach (two 50 Gbit/s lanes), using RS-FEC
100GBASE-CR1	802.3ck-2022 (162)		Single-lane over twin-axial copper with at least 2 m reach
100GBASE-KR4	802.3bj-2014 (93)		Four lanes 25 Gbit/s each over a backplane
100GBASE-KR2	802.3cd-2018 (137)		Two 50 Gbit/s lanes over printed-circuit backplane, consistent with 802.3bs Clause 124, using RS-FEC
100GBASE-KR1	802.3ck-2022 (163)		Single-lane over electrical backplanes supporting an insertion loss of up to 28 dB at 26.5625 GBd
100GBASE-KP4	802.3bj-2014 (94)		Using PAM4 modulation on four lanes 12.5 GBd each over a backplane, using RS-FEC

=== 200 Gbit/s ===
First generation 200 Gbit/s have been defined by the IEEE 802.3bs task force and standardized in 802.3bs-2017. The IEEE 802.3cd task force has developed 50 and next-generation 100 and 200 Gbit/s standards using one, two, or four 50 Gbit/s lanes respectively. The next generation using 100 Gbit/s lanes was standardized in September 2022 as IEEE 802.3ck along with 100 and 400 Gbit/s PHYs and attachment unit interfaces (AUI) using 100 Gbit/s lanes.

Name	Standard (Clause)	Common connectors	Description
Fiber-optical cable
200GBASE-DR4	802.3bs-2017 (121)	MPO	Four PAM-4 lanes (26.5625 GBd) using individual strands of single-mode fiber with 500 m reach (1310 nm)
200GBASE-FR4	802.3bs-2017 (122)	SC, LC	Four PAM-4 lanes (26.5625 GBd) using four wavelengths (CWDM) over single-mode fiber with 2 km reach (1270/1290/1310/1330 nm)
200GBASE-LR4	802.3bs-2017 (122)	SC, LC	Four PAM-4 lanes (26.5625 GBd) using four wavelengths (DWDM, 1296/1300/1305/1309 nm) over single-mode fiber with 10 km reach
200GBASE-SR4	802.3cd-2018 (138)	MPO	Four PAM-4 lanes at 26.5625 GBd each over OM4 multi-mode fiber with 100 m reach, 70 m over OM3
200GBASE-ER4	802.3cn-2019 (122)		Four-lane using four wavelengths (DWDM, 1296/1300/1305/1309 nm) over single-mode fiber with 30 km reach, 40 km over engineered links
TBD	802.3df		single-pair single-mode fiber with 500 m reach
TBD	802.3df		single-pair single-mode fiber with 2 km reach
Other
200GBASE-CR4	802.3cd-2018 (136)	QSFP28, microQSFP, QSFP-DD, OSFP	Four PAM-4 lanes (26.5625 GBd) over twinaxial cable with 3 m reach
200GBASE-KR4	802.3cd-2018 (137)		Four PAM-4 lanes (26.5625 GBd) over printed-circuit backplane, consistent with 802.3bs Clause 124
200GBASE-CR2	802.3ck-2022 (162)		Two-lane over twin-axial copper with at least 2 m reach
200GBASE-KR2	802.3ck-2022 (163)		Two-lane over electrical backplanes supporting an insertion loss of up to 28 dB at 26.56 GBd
TBD	802.3df		single-pair twinaxial cable with 1 m reach

=== 400 Gbit/s ===
An Ethernet standard capable of 200 and 400 Gbit/s is defined in IEEE 802.3bs-2017. 1 Tbit/s may be a further goal.

In May 2018, IEEE 802.3 started the 802.3ck task force to develop standards for 100, 200, and 400 Gbit/s PHYs and attachment unit interfaces (AUI) using 100 Gbit/s lanes. The new standards were approved in September 2022.

In 2008, Robert Metcalfe, one of the co-inventors of Ethernet, said he believed commercial applications using Terabit Ethernet may occur by 2015, though it might require new Ethernet standards. It was predicted this would be followed rapidly by a scaling to 100 Terabit, possibly as early as 2020. These were theoretical predictions of technological ability, rather than estimates of when such speeds would actually become available at a practical price point.

Name	Standard (Clause)	Common connectors	Description
Fiber-optical cable
400GBASE-SR16	802.3bs-2017 (123)	MPO-32	Sixteen lanes (26.5625 Gbit/s) using individual strands of OM4/OM5 multi-mode fiber with 100 m reach or 70 m over OM3
400GBASE-DR4	802.3bs-2017 (124)	MPO	Four PAM-4 lanes (53.125 GBd) using individual strands of single-mode fiber with 500 m reach (1310 nm)
400GBASE-FR8	802.3bs-2017 (122)	SC, LC	Eight PAM-4 lanes (26.5625 GBd) using eight wavelengths (CWDM) over single-mode fiber with 2 km reach
400GBASE-LR8	802.3bs-2017 (122)	SC, LC	Eight PAM-4 lanes (26.5625 GBd) using eight wavelengths (DWDM) over single-mode fiber with 10 km reach
400GBASE-FR4	802.3cu-2021 (151)	SC, LC	Four lanes/wavelengths (CWDM, 1271/1291/1311/1331 nm) over single-mode fiber with 2 km reach, using PAM4
400GBASE-LR4-6	802.3cu-2021 (151)	SC, LC	Four lanes/wavelengths (CWDM, 1271/1291/1311/1331 nm) over single-mode fiber with 6 km reach, using PAM4
400GBASE-SR8	802.3cm-2020 (138)	MPO-24, MPO-16	Eight-lane using individual strands of multi-mode fiber with 100 m reach
400GBASE-SR4.2	802.3cm-2020 (150)	MPO-12	Eight-lane using four multi-mode fiber pairs and two wavelengths (850 and 910 nm) with 70/100/150 m reach over OM3/OM4/OM5 respectively
400GBASE-ER8	802.3cn-2019 (122)	SC, LC	Eight-lane using eight wavelengths over single-mode fiber with 40 km reach
400GBASE-ZR	802.3cw (155 & 156)	SC, LC	At least 80 km over single-mode fiber using a single wavelength with 16QAM over a DWDM system
TBD	802.3df		two pairs of single-mode fiber with 500 m reach
Other
400GBASE-CR4	802.3ck-2022 (162)		Four-lane over twin-axial copper with at least 2 m reach
400GBASE-KR4	802.3ck-2022 (163)		Four-lane over electrical backplanes supporting an insertion loss of up to 28 dB at 26.56 GBd
TBD	802.3df		two pairs of twin-axial copper with 1 m reach

=== 800 Gbit/s ===
The Ethernet Technology Consortium proposed an 800 Gbit/s Ethernet PCS variant based on tightly bundled 400GBASE-R in April 2020.

In February 2024, the IEEE 802.3df Task Force defined variants for 800 Gbit/s Ethernet over twinaxial copper, electrical backplanes, single-mode and multi-mode optical fiber along with new 200 and 400 Gbit/s variants using 100 Gbit/s lanes.

Name	Standard (Clause)	Common connectors	Description
Fiber-optical cable
800GBASE-VR8	802.3df-2024 (167)	MPO-16	eight pairs of OM5 multi-mode fiber, 53.125 GBd with PAM-4, for 50 m reach
800GBASE-SR8	802.3df-2024 (167)	MPO-16	eight pairs of OM5 multi-mode fiber, 53.125 GBd with PAM-4, for 100 m reach
800GBASE-DR8	802.3df-2024 (124)	MPO-16	eight pairs of single-mode fiber, 53.125 GBd with PAM-4, for 2–500 m reach,
800GBASE-DR8-2	802.3df-2024 (124)	MPO-16	eight pairs of single-mode fiber, 53.125 GBd with PAM-4, for 2–2000 m reach
Other
800GBASE-CR8	802.3df-2024 (162)	QSFP-DD800; OSFP	eight lanes over twinax, 53.125 GBd with PAM-4, for 2 m reach
800GBASE-KR8	802.2df-2024 (163)		eight lanes over electrical backplane, 53.125 GBd with PAM-4,
800GBASE-R			As of April 2020, the PCS and PMA sublayers seem to be defined, using eight lanes of 100 Gbit/s each, and connecting with the transceiver module through a C2M or C2C interface defined in 802.3ck.

=== 1.6 Tbit/s ===
In December 2022, IEEE started the P802.3dj Task Force to define variants for 200, 400, 800 and 1600 Gbit/s over twinaxial copper, electrical backplanes, single-mode and multi-mode optical fiber along with new variants using 200 Gbit/s lanes.

Name	Standard (Clause)	Common connectors	Description
Fiber-optical cable
TBD	802.3dj		eight pairs of single-mode fiber for 500 m reach
TBD	802.3dj		eight pairs of single-mode fiber for 2 km reach
Other
TBD	802.3dj		eight twinaxial copper pairs for 1 meter reach

=== First mile ===
Ethernet in the first mile provides Internet access service directly from providers to homes and small businesses.

Name	Standard (Clause)	Description
10BaseS	Proprietary	Ethernet over VDSL, used in Long Reach Ethernet products; uses passband instead of the indicated baseband
2BASE-TL	802.3ah-2004 (61&63)	Over telephone wires
10PASS-TS	802.3ah-2004 (61&62)	Over telephone wires
100BASE-LX10	802.3ah-2004 (58)	Single-mode fiber-optics
100BASE-BX10	802.3ah-2004 (58)	Single-mode fiber-optics
1000BASE-LX10	802.3ah-2004 (59)	Single-mode fiber-optics
1000BASE-BX10	802.3ah-2004 (59)	Single-mode fiber-optics
1000BASE-PX10	802.3ah-2004 (60)	Passive optical network
1000BASE-PX20	802.3ah-2004 (60)	Passive optical network
10GBASE-PR; 10/1GBASE-PRX	802.3av-2009 (75)	10 Gbit/s passive optical network with 1 or 10 Gbit/s uplink for 10 or 20 km range
25GBASE-PR; 50GBASE-PR	802.3ca-2020 (141)	25 and 50 Gbit/s passive optical network

== Sublayers ==
Starting with Fast Ethernet, the physical layer specifications are divided into three sublayers in order to simplify design and interoperability:

- PCS (Physical Coding Sublayer) - This sublayer performs auto-negotiation and basic encoding (e.g., 8b/10b), lane separation and recombination. For Ethernet, the bit rate at the top of the PCS is the nominal bit rate, e.g. 10 Mbit/s for classic Ethernet or 1000 Mbit/s for Gigabit Ethernet.
- PMA (Physical Medium Attachment sublayer) - This sublayer performs PMA framing, octet synchronization/detection, and polynomial scrambling/descrambling.
- PMD (Physical Medium Dependent sublayer) - This sublayer consists of a transceiver for the physical medium.

== Twisted-pair cable ==
Several varieties of Ethernet were specifically designed to run over 4-pair copper structured cabling already installed in many locations. In a departure from both 10BASE-T and 100BASE-TX, 1000BASE-T and above use all four cable pairs for simultaneous transmission in both directions through the use of echo cancellation.

Using point-to-point copper cabling provides the opportunity to deliver electrical power along with the data. This is called power over Ethernet and there are several variations defined in IEEE 802.3 standards. Combining 10BASE-T (or 100BASE-TX) with Mode A allows a hub or a switch to transmit both power and data over only two pairs. This was designed to leave the other two pairs free for analog telephone signals. The pins used in Mode B supply power over the spare pairs not used by 10BASE-T and 100BASE-TX. 4PPoE defined in IEEE 802.3bt can use all four pairs to supply up to 100 W.

8P8C wiring (MDI)
Pin	Pair	Color	Telephone	10BASE-T, 100BASE-TX	1000BASE-T onwards	PoE mode A	PoE mode B
1	3	white/green		TX+	BI_DA+	48 V out	
2	3	green		TX−	BI_DA–	48 V out	
3	2	white/orange		RX+	BI_DB+	48 V return	
4	1	blue	ring	unused	BI_DC+		48 V out
5	1	white/blue	tip	unused	BI_DC–		48 V out
6	2	orange		RX−	BI_DB–	48 V return	
7	4	white/brown		unused	BI_DD+		48 V return
8	4	brown		unused	BI_DD–		48 V return

The cable requirements depend on the transmission speed and the employed encoding method. Generally, faster speeds require both higher-grade cables and more sophisticated encoding.

== Minimum cable lengths ==
Some fiber connections have minimum cable lengths due to maximum level constraints on received signals. Fiber ports designed for long-haul wavelengths may require a signal attenuator if used within a building.

10BASE2 installations, running on RG-58 coaxial cable, require a minimum of 0.5 m between stations tapped into the network cable to minimize reflections.

10BASE-T, 100BASE-T, and 1000BASE-T installations running on twisted pair cable use a star topology. No minimum cable length is required for these networks.

== Related standards ==
Some networking standards are not part of the IEEE 802.3 Ethernet standard, but support the Ethernet frame format, and are capable of interoperating with it.

- LattisNet—A SynOptics pre-standard twisted-pair 10 Mbit/s variant.
- 100BaseVG—An early contender for 100 Mbit/s Ethernet. It runs over four pairs of Category 3 cable but was not commercially successful.
- TIA 100BASE-SX—Promoted by the Telecommunications Industry Association. 100BASE-SX is an alternative implementation of 100 Mbit/s Ethernet over fiber; it is incompatible with the official 100BASE-FX standard. Its main feature is interoperability with 10BASE-FL, supporting autonegotiation between 10 and 100 Mbit/s operation – a feature lacking in the official standards due to the use of differing LED wavelengths. It was targeted at the installed base of 10 Mbit/s fiber networks.
- TIA 1000BASE-TX—Promoted by the Telecommunications Industry Association, it was a commercial failure. 1000BASE-TX uses a simpler protocol than the official 1000BASE-T standard so the electronics can be cheaper, but requires Category 6 cable.
- G.hn—A standard developed by ITU-T and promoted by HomeGrid Forum for high-speed (up to 1 Gbit/s) local area networks over existing home wiring (coaxial cables, power lines and phone lines). G.hn defines an Application Protocol Convergence (APC) layer that accepts Ethernet frames and encapsulates them into G.hn MSDUs.

Other networking standards do not use the Ethernet frame format but can still be connected to Ethernet using MAC-based bridging.

- 802.11—Standards for wireless local area networks (LANs), sold as Wi-Fi
- 802.16—Standards for wireless metropolitan area networks (MANs), sold as WiMAX

Other special-purpose physical layers include Avionics Full-Duplex Switched Ethernet and TTEthernet.
