= PAF =

PAF may refer to:

== Computing ==
- Personal Ancestral File, a genealogy data program
- PME Aggregation Function, a networking technology
- Postcode Address File, a collection of UK postal addresses and postcodes, available from Royal Mail
- .PAF, filename extension of PortableApps files
- Programmation Automatique de Formules, a French programming language for the CAB 500 computer

== Medicine ==
- Paroxysmal atrial fibrillation
- Platelet-activating factor
- Population attributable fraction (epidemiology)
- Pure autonomic failure
- Penicillum antifungal proteins

== Military ==
- Palestinian Arab Front
- Protestant Action Force

=== Air forces ===
- Pakistan Air Force
  - PAF Academy Risalpur, see Pakistan Air Force Academy
  - PAF College Lower Topa
  - PAF College Sargodha
- Palestinian Air Force
- Patrouille de France, an aerobatic team of the French Air Force
- Philippine Air Force
- Polish Air Force

== Science ==
- Phased array Feed
- Population attributable fraction
- Platelet-activating factor

== Other uses ==
- P.A.F. (pickup), a first humbucker guitar pickup
- Paf (company), a Finnish gambling company
- Palestine Athletic Federation
- Performing Arts Festival of Indian Institute of Technology Bombay
- Professional Arena Football, a professional sport league launched in 2018
- Pakuba Airfield, by IATA airport code

== See also ==
- PAF Public School (disambiguation), Pakistan Air Force-operated boarding schools
