= Pat Thaler =

American electrical engineer and Ethernet contributor

Patricia A. Thaler
- Born: Utica, New York, U.S.
- Education: University of California (BSEE), Stanford University (MSEE)
- Occupation: Electrical engineer
- Known for: Ethernet, IEEE 802 standards

Pat Thaler is an American electrical engineer recognized for her contributions to the development of Ethernet and leadership within the IEEE 802 standards community. She has been instrumental in advancing several networking standards, including StarLAN, 10BASE-T, and 100VG-AnyLAN.

== Early life and education ==
Thaler was born in Utica, New York. She earned a Bachelor of Science in Electrical Engineering (BSEE) from the University of California in 1974 and a Master of Science in Electrical Engineering (MSEE) from Stanford University in 1978.

== Career ==
Thaler began her career at IBM, where she worked on machines for the manufacture of magnetic disks. She joined Hewlett-Packard in 1976, initially working on the HP 8660 signal synthesizer and later on computer interface card hardware design.

She became a principal engineer for LAN architecture and standards at HP’s Roseville Networks Division. Her work included development of Ethernet network interface cards, repeaters, and 10BASE-T transceivers. Thaler was an early contributor to StarLAN, a pioneering standard for Ethernet over twisted pair wiring, which laid the groundwork for future Ethernet technologies. Thaler has also worked at Agilent Technologies and Broadcom.

== IEEE and standards contributions ==
Thaler has served in several IEEE 802 leadership roles. She chaired the IEE 802.3 committee and the 10BASE-T working group, which standardized Ethernet over unshielded twisted pair cabling, making Ethernet feasible for office environments. She also chaired the IEEE 802.12 working group, contributing to standards that included support for full duplex, redundancy, and gigabit-class enhancements. She played a leading role in the architecture and standards development of 100VG-AnyLAN, a protocol that aimed to provide deterministic Ethernet performance over Category 5 cabling. She was later made a vice-chair of IEEE 802.

She is credited with a patent related to encoding techniques for 100VG-AnyLAN and has been a contributor to repeater and physical-layer standards in Ethernet. She also served as liaison between IEEE 802 and the Internet Engineering Task Force (IETF) and co-authored RFC 7241, which outlines the collaborative relationship between the two organizations.

== Professional bodies and recognition ==
Thaler is a senior member of the IEEE and the Society of Women Engineers.

== Personal life ==
Thaler had married and had three sons as of 1995. Outside of her professional work, she has participated in amateur radio civil emergency service.

== See also ==
- Women in engineering
