= Ronald V. Schmidt =

American computer network engineer (1944–2022)

- Born: March 31, 1944
- Died: September 22, 2022 (aged 78); Portola Valley, California, U.S.
- Education: University of California, Berkeley
- Occupation: Electrical engineering
- Known for: LattisNet; Ethernet over twisted pair

Ronald V. Schmidt (March 31, 1944 – September 22, 2022) was an American computer network engineer.

Schmidt was born in San Francisco, California. He graduated with B.S. (in 1966), M.S. (1968), and Ph.D. (1970) degrees in electrical engineering and computer science from the University of California, Berkeley. From 1970 to 1971 he was a postdoctoral research assistant at University College, London. He then joined Bell Laboratories in 1971.

He was hired by Xerox PARC to develop a version of Ethernet for optical fiber in 1980 called Fibernet II. Schmidt co-founded SynOptics Communications in 1985 with Andrew K. Ludwick. After its merger in 1994, he served on the board of directors of the resulting company Bay Networks starting in May 1996.

Schmidt was executive vice president and chief technical officer (CTO) of Bay Networks from 1994 to 1997. In 1998 he became a vice president of the Bell Labs research facility at Silicon Valley. He left Bell Labs in February 2000. He served on the board of directors of Silicon Image from April 1997 until April 2004.

Schmidt cofounded the Flintridge & Portola Valley Railroad with Peter Mosley in 1991.

Schmidt died on September 22, 2022, at his home in Portola Valley, California

== See also ==
- LattisNet, the product invented in 1985
