= Andrew K. Ludwick =

- Born: 1946 (age 79–80); United States
- Occupations: Entrepreneur and businessman
- Known for: Co-founder of SynOptics

Andrew K. Ludwick is an American entrepreneur and businessman who co-founder of SynOptics and was the CEO and President of SynOptics Communications and CEO and President of Bay Networks from 1985-1996.

Before founding SynOptics in 1985, Ludwick worked as an executive assistant at Xerox Corporation. Within Xerox, he teamed up with Xerox PARC researcher Ronald V. Schmidt to promote the idea of commercializing Schmidt's invention of a fiber optic version of the ethernet computer networking system. Although they were rebuffed in their goal of turning this system into a Xerox product, Xerox instead allowed Ludwick and Schmidt to spin it off into a separate company (with equity held by Xerox in exchange for their intellectual property). The company, initially named Astra Communications, eventually became SynOptics.

Business positions
Preceded by none	President & CEO; SynOptics; 1985 - 1994	Succeeded by SynOptics merged with Wellfleet to form Bay Networks
Business positions
Preceded by none	President & CEO; Bay Networks; 1994 - 1996	Succeeded by David L. House
