= Synoptics =

Synoptics may refer to:

- Synoptic Gospels, the gospels of Matthew, Mark, and Luke, but not John, with accounts of the life or teachings of Jesus
- SynOptics, a Santa Clara, California-based early computer network equipment vendor from 1985 until 1994
- Synoptic scale meteorology, a visualisation of meteorology (particularly forecasts) applicable to the geostrophic approximation
