= EPOC =

EPOC may be:

- Excess post-exercise oxygen consumption
- Emotiv EPOC, consumer brain–computer interface devices for PC.
- EPOC (operating system), the precursor OS to the Symbian operating system
- Efficient Probabilistic Public-Key Encryption Scheme
- The Electric Power Optimization Centre at the University of Auckland
- EPoC - Ethernet passive optical network (EPON) Protocol over Coax
- Exploration Production and Operations Contract, a proposed NASA contract for Artemis 5 et seq.
