= Penril =

Defunct modem manufacturer

Penril DataComm Networks, Inc.
- Type: Public
- Industry: Computer; Telecommunications
- Founded: 1968; 58 years ago in Gaithersburg, Maryland
- Defunct: 1996; 30 years ago
- Fate: Partially acquired by Bay Networks; remainder spun off into Access Beyond
- Products: Networking hardware; Networking software

Penril DataComm Networks, Inc. was a computer telecommunications hardware company that made some acquisitions and was eventually split into two parts: one was acquired by Bay Networks and the other was a newly formed company named Access Beyond. The focus of both company's products was end-to-end data transfer. By the mid-1990s, with the popularization of the internet, this was no longer of wide interest.

== History ==
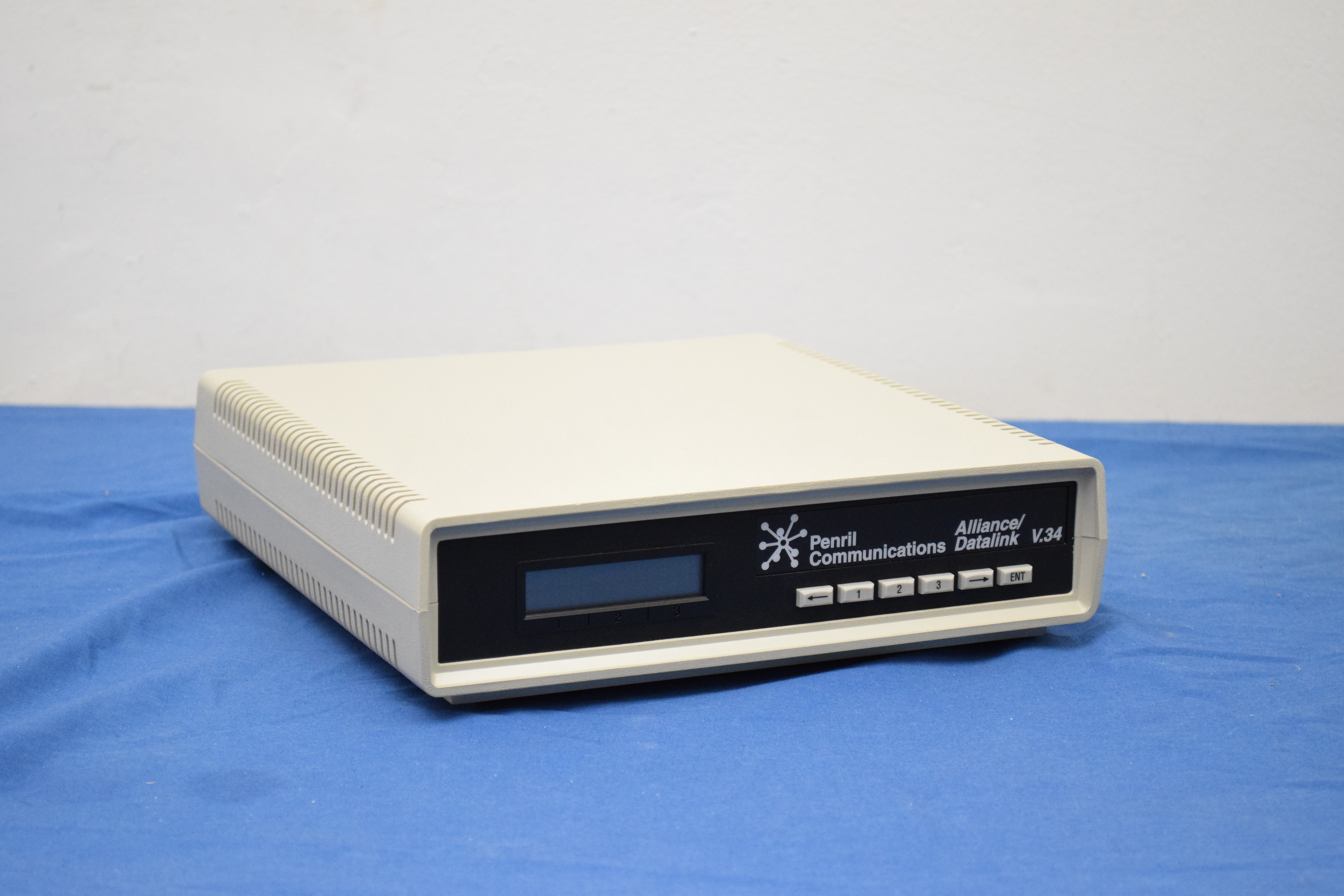
Penril Alliance/Datalink v.34, modem from c. 1992

Penril, whose earnings reports and other financials were followed by The New York Times in the 1990s, made several acquisitions but also grew internally. Following its Datability acquisition it renamed itself Penril Datability Networks.

By the time the 1968-founded Penril was acquired by Bay their name was Penril DataComm Networks. The company, which as of 1985 "had made 14 acquisitions in 12 years," also had done extensive work regarding quality control, and leveraged their product line by what The Washington Post called clever packaging: "software, cables, instructions and telephone support" sold to those less technically skilled as "Network in a Box."

== Datability ==
Datability Software Systems Inc. was the initial name of what by 1991 became 'Datability, Inc.', "a manufacturer of hardware that links computer networks." The 1977-founded firm began as a software consulting company, especially in the area of databases. To speed up project development they built a program generator, which they marketed as Control 10/20 (targeted at users of Digital Equipment Corporation's DECsystem-10 and DECSYSTEM-20). After trying their hand at time-sharing they built hardware to enhance bridging these computers to DEC's VAX product line. In particular they focused on Digital's LAT protocol, selling "boxes" that reimplemented the protocol, at a lower price than DEC's. They later expanded into other areas of telecommunications hardware The firm relocated to a larger manufacturing plant in 1991 and was acquired by Penril in 1993.

== Access Beyond ==
Access Beyond was initially housed by Penril, from which it was spun off. A securities analyst noted that Access began operations with no debt. They subsequently merged with Hayes Corporation. Some of the funds brought to the merger came from a sale by Penril of two of its divisions, each bringing about $4 million.

== Ron Howard ==
Ron Howard, founder of Datability, became part of Penril when the latter acquired the former, and was CEO of Access Beyond when it was spun off by Penril. Access merged with Hayes Microcomputer Products and was renamed Hayes Corp, at which time Howard became executive VP of business development and corporate vice chairman of Hayes.

== People ==
In the matter of hiring immigrants, in an industry where recent arrivals came from a culture of six day work weeks, and subcontracting was then common, these assembly line workers at Penril comprised about 25%, compared to double in other firms. Placement was overseen by government agencies.

== Controversy ==
Penril had a joint development agreement, beginning in 1990, with a Standard Microsystems Corporation (SMSC) subsidiary. A dispute arose, and the matter was brought to court.

Penril was awarded $3.5 million in 1996.
