= Michael Silverton =

Michael Silverton is an American computer scientist.

== Biography ==
Fiberhood Networks, Inc, a Silicon Valley company championed by Silverton, and co-founded Sinuhe Hardegree and Jonathan Usuka, along with Christopher Lein, Chris Minchberg, Keith Cooley, and Joe Villareal, failed financially, but the engineering success and ensuing industry enthusiasm from the likes of Pirelli, Corning, France Telecom, Telstra, SBC Communications, and industry standards groups like the IEEE, all validated a proof of concept for this first field-operational implementation of its kind. The Information superhighway term was used in the National Information Infrastructure effort of the 1990s. Silverton's 1997 Stanford University thesis described an "Information Superdriveway", extending early analogies of "internet as roadway" connecting consumers to the information city streets and global superhighways. The company existed from about 1998 through 2001. It partnered with PAIX, an early Palo Alto Internet exchange. In 1999 Silverton became founding director of the Open Access Alliance of the Bay Area, a group advocating for independent Internet service providers. In 2001 the company still planned to expand.

Silverton presented his experience to the Ethernet in the first mile (EFM) study group in March 2001. After several years of industry collaboration, the standard was published in June 2004. In 2004 he was interviewed as an early adopter of voice over Internet Protocol (VoIP) technology.
