= StarLAN =

Standard for Ethernet over twisted pair wiring

StarLAN was the first IEEE 802.3 standard for Ethernet over twisted pair wiring. It was standardized by the IEEE Standards Association as 802.3e in 1986, as the 1BASE5 version of Ethernet. The StarLAN Task Force was chaired by Bob Galin.

== Description ==
An early version of StarLAN was developed by Tim Rock and Bill Aranguren at AT&T Information Systems as an experimental system in 1983. The name StarLAN was coined by the IEEE task force based on the fact that it used a star topology from a central hub in contrast to the bus network of the shared cable 10BASE5 and 10BASE2 networks that had been based on ALOHAnet.

The standard known as 1BASE5 was adopted as 802.3e in 1986 by members of the IEEE 802.3 standards committee as the Twisted Pair Medium Access Control sublayer and Physical Signalling sublayer specification in section 12. StarLAN ran at a speed of 1 Mbit/s, among the slowest of network technologies.

A major design goal in StarLAN was reduction in Ethernet installation costs by the reuse of existing telephone on-premises wiring and compatibility with analog and digital telephone signals in the same cable bundle. The signal modulation and wire pairing used by StarLAN were carefully chosen so that they would not affect or be affected by either the analog signal of a normal call, on hook and off hook transients, or the 20 Hz high-voltage analog ring signal. Reuse of existing wires was critical in many buildings where rewiring was cost prohibitive, where running new wire would disturb asbestos within the building infrastructure, and where the bus topology of coaxial bus Ethernet was not installable.

The wire positioning called T568B in the standard TIA/EIA-568 (later called ANSI/TIA-568) was originally devised for StarLAN, and pair 1 (blue) was left unused to accommodate an analog phone pair. Pairs 2 and 3 (orange and green respectively) carry the StarLAN signals. This greatly simplified the installation of combined voice and data wiring in countries that used registered jack connectors and American wiring practices for their phone service (connecting both to the same cable was a simple matter of using a pin–pin RJ45 splitter or punching down the same wires to two ports). This arrangement prevented harm to private branch exchange (PBX) equipment in the event that a StarLAN cable was plugged into the wrong device.

Since 1BASE5 reused existing wiring, maximum link distance was only approximated at 250 m; depending on cable performance up to 500 m was possible. Up to five chained hubs were allowed.

Parts of the StarLAN technology were patented by AT&T and were initially part of a wider vision from AT&T to link their UNIX-based AT&T 3B2 minicomputers to a network of MS-DOS PCs. A StarLAN card was also offered for the AT&T UNIX PC.

=== StarLAN 10 ===
In 1988, AT&T released StarLAN 10 operating at 10 Mbit/s. The original StarLAN was renamed StarLAN 1, reflecting its 1 Mbit/s speed.

It was adopted by other networking vendors such as Hewlett-Packard and Ungermann-Bass. Integrated circuits were introduced starting in 1986 that reduced the cost of the interfaces.

StarLAN 10 and SynOptics LattisNet provided the basis for the later 10 megabit per second standard 10BASE-T. The 10BASE-T task force was chaired by Pat Thaler, a member of the StarLAN task force. 10BASE-T used the basic signalling of StarLAN 10 and added link beat. Some network interface cards such as the 3Com 3C-523 could be used with either StarLAN 10 or 10BASE-T, by switching link beat on or off.

Comparison of twisted-pair-based Ethernet physical transport layers (TP-PHYs)
| Name | Standard | Status | Speed (Mbit/s) | Pairs required | Lanes per direction | Bits per hertz | Line code | Symbol rate per lane (MBd) | Bandwidth | Max distance (m) | Cable | Cable rating (MHz) | Usage |
|---|---|---|---|---|---|---|---|---|---|---|---|---|---|
| StarLAN-1 1BASE5 | 802.3e-1987 | obsolete | 1 | 2 | 1 | 1 | PE | 1 | 1 | 250 | voice grade | ~12 | LAN |
| StarLAN-10 | 802.3e-1988 | obsolete | 10 | 2 | 1 | 1 | PE | 10 | 10 | ~100 | voice grade | ~12 | LAN |
