= Long Reach Ethernet =

Proprietary networking protocol marketed by Cisco Systems

Long Reach Ethernet (LRE) was a proprietary networking protocol marketed by Cisco Systems, intended to support multi-megabit (5 to 15 Mbit/s) performance over telephone-grade unshielded twisted pair wiring over distances up to 5,000 feet (1.5 km). Supporting such distance ranges, LRE is technically classified as a Metropolitan area network (MAN) technology. Technically the protocol was similar to very-high-bitrate digital subscriber line (VDSL), practically Ethernet over VDSL (EoVDSL).

The technology was sometimes considered an example of Ethernet in the first mile (EFM). Several networking vendors offered compatible networking hardware, but the technology became obsolete.

== Description ==
Like standard VDSL, LRE allowed existing telephone wiring that connects an organization's offices to be used to network those offices together using standard Ethernet protocol without incurring the huge cost of deploying fiber-optic cable or limiting organizations to the bandwidth provided by modems or other digital subscriber line services.

Other sample applications included Internet access to hotel rooms or college dormitories over existing installed telephone wiring.

LRE was compatible with VDSL ETSI Band Plan 998.

Cisco sold Cisco Catalyst model 2900 switches using Infineon Technologies PEF22822/PEB22811 VDSL QAM chipset like many other VDSL concentrators. The customer-premises equipment included the Cisco 575 desktop bridge. Products were announced in February 2001 to be available in April 2001. Infineon used the name 10BaseS for the technology,

Cisco included LRE in its Mobile Office marketing effort. A few compatible devices were produced. Cisco announced end-of-sale for the LRE products in October 2006, and its explanation page was removed from their web site in 2007.

HomePNA promotes similar technologies for use within a home rather than to a central office or business, with its 2.0, 3.0, and 3.1 releases. Different frequency bands are used so that VDSL and HomePNA can share the same wires.
