= 10G-EPON =

Computer networking standard

10 Gbit/s Ethernet Passive Optical Network
- International standard: IEEE 802.3av
- Developed by: IEEE 802.3av 10G-EPON Task Force
- Introduced: 2009-09-11
- Industry: Telecom, ISP

The 10 Gbit/s Ethernet Passive Optical Network standard, better known as 10G-EPON allows computer network connections over telecommunication provider infrastructure. The standard supports two configurations: symmetric, operating at 10 Gbit/s data rate in both directions, and asymmetric, operating at 10 Gbit/s in the downstream (provider to customer) direction and 1 Gbit/s in the upstream direction. It was ratified as IEEE 802.3av standard in 2009. EPON is a type of passive optical network, with Time-division multiple access which is a point-to-multipoint network using passive fiber-optic splitters rather than powered devices for fan-out from hub to customers.

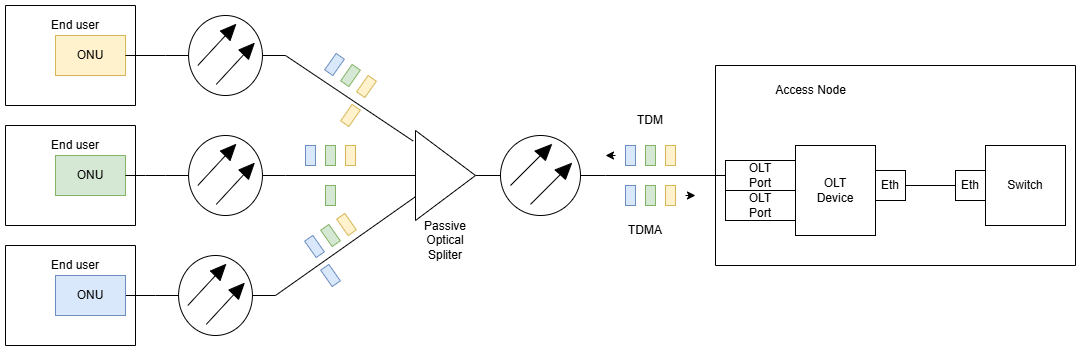

== Standardization ==
The Ethernet in the first mile task force of the Institute of Electrical and Electronics Engineers (IEEE) 802.3 standards committee published standards that included a passive optical network (PON) variant in 2004.

In March 2006, the IEEE 802.3 held a call for interest for a 10 Gbit/s Ethernet PON study group. According to the CFI materials, representatives from the following companies supported the formation of the study group: Advance/Newhouse Communications, Aeluros, Agilent, Allied Telesyn, Alloptic, Ample Communications, Astar-ODSM, Broadcom, Centillium Communications, China Netcom, China Telecom, Chunghwa Telecom, Cisco Systems, ClariPhy Communications, Conexant Systems, Corecess, Corning, Delta Electronics, ETRI, Fiberxon, FOTEK Optoelectronics, ImmenStar, Infinera, ITRI, KDDI R&D Labs., K-Opticom, Korea Telecom, NEC, OpNext, Picolight, Quake Technologies, Salira Systems, Samsung Electronics, Softbank BB, Teknovus, Teranetics, Texas Instruments, Telecom Malaysia, TranSwitch, UNH-IOL, UTStarcom, Vitesse.

By September 2006, IEEE 802.3 formed the 802.3av 10G-EPON Task Force to produce a draft standard. In September 2009, the IEEE 802 Plenary ratified an amendment to 802.3 to publish 802.3av amendment as the standard IEEE Std 802.3av-2009.

Major milestones:

Date	Milestone
September 2006	IEEE 802.3av task force was formed and met in Knoxville, Tennessee.
December 2007	Draft D1.0 produced.
July 2008	Draft D2.0 produced. Working Group balloting began.
November 2008	Cut-off date for last technical change
January 2009	Draft D3.0 produced. Sponsor balloting began.
September 2009	Standard approved.

The work on the 10G-EPON was continued by the IEEE P802.3bk Extended EPON Task Force, formed in March 2012. The major goals for this Task Force included adding support for PX30, PX40, PRX40, and PR40 power budget classes to both 1G-EPON and 10G-EPON. The 802.3bk amendment was approved by the IEEE-SA SB in August 2013 and published soon thereafter as the standard IEEE Std 802.3bk-2013. On 4 June 2020, the IEEE approved IEEE 802.3ca, which allows for symmetric or asymmetric operation with downstream speeds of 25 Gbit/s or 50 Gbit/s, and upstream speeds of 10 Gbit/s, 25 Gbit/s, or 50 Gbit/s over the same power-distance-splitter budgets.

== Architecture ==
=== Symmetric (10/10G-EPON) ===
Symmetric-rate 10/10G-EPON supports both transmit and receive data paths operating at 10 Gbit/s. The main driver for 10/10G-EPON was to provide adequate downstream and upstream bandwidth to support multi-family residential building (known in the standard as Multi Dwelling Unit or MDU) customers. When deployed in the MDU configuration, one EPON Optical Network Unit (ONU) may be connected to up to a thousand subscribers.

The 10/10G-EPON employs a number of functions that are common to other point-to-point Ethernet standards. For example, such functions as 64B/66B line coding, self-synchronizing scrambler, or gearbox are also used in optical fiber types of 10 Gigabit Ethernet links.

=== Asymmetric (10/1G-EPON) ===
The asymmetric 10/1G-EPON appear less challenging than the symmetric option, as this specification relies on fairly mature technologies. The upstream transmission is identical to that of the 1G-EPON (as specified in IEEE standard 802.3ah), using deployed burst-mode optical transceivers. The downstream transmission, which uses continuous-mode optics, will rely on the maturity of 10 Gbit/s point-to-point Ethernet devices.

=== Efficiency ===
Like all EPON networks, 10G-EPON transmits data in variable-length packets up to 1518 bytes, as specified in the IEEE 802.3 standard. These variable-length packets are better suited to IP traffic than the GEM frames used by other Passive Optical Networks, such as GPON which is designed for multiple traffic types including ATM, Ethernet, T1 and POTS. This can significantly reduce 10G-EPON's overhead in comparison to other systems. Typical 10G-EPON overhead is approximately 7.42%. Typical GPON overhead is 13.22%. This high data-to-overhead ratio also enables high utilization with low-cost optical components.

=== Power budgets ===
The 802.3av defines several power budgets, denoted either PR or PRX. PRX power budget describes asymmetric–rate PHY for PON operating at 10 Gbit/s downstream and 1 Gbit/s upstream. PR power budget describes symmetric–rate PHY for PON operating at 10 Gbit/s downstream and 10 Gbit/s upstream. Each power budget is further identified with a numeric representation of its class, where value of 10 represents low power budget, value of 20 represents medium power budget, and value of 30 represents high power budget. The 802.3av draft standard defines the following power budgets:

Power budget	Downstream line rate (Gbit/s)	Upstream line rate (Gbit/s)	Channel insertion loss (dB)	Notes
PRX10	10.3125	1.25	20	compatible with PX10 power budget defined for 1G-EPON by 802.3ah
PRX20	10.3125	1.25	24	compatible with PX20 power budget defined for 1G-EPON by 802.3ah
PRX30	10.3125	1.25	29	compatible with PX30 power budget defined for 1G-EPON by 802.3bk
PR10	10.3125	10.3125	20	compatible with PX10 power budget defined for 1G-EPON by 802.3ah
PR20	10.3125	10.3125	24	compatible with PX20 power budget defined for 1G-EPON by 802.3ah
PR30	10.3125	10.3125	29	compatible with PX30 power budget defined for 1G-EPON by 802.3bk

The 802.3bk added support for a new 10/10G-EPON and 10/1G-EPON power class for PR or PRX PMDs, respectively, as shown below:

Power budget	Downstream line rate (Gbit/s)	Upstream line rate (Gbit/s)	Channel insertion loss (dB)	Notes
PRX40	10.3125	1.25	33	compatible with PX40 power budget defined for 1G-EPON by 802.3bk
PR40	10.3125	10.3125	33	compatible with PX40 power budget defined for 1G-EPON by 802.3bk

=== Forward error correction ===
The 10G-EPON employs a stream-based forward error correction (FEC) mechanism based on Reed-Solomon(255, 223). The FEC is mandatory for all channels operating at 10 Gbit/s rate, i.e., both downstream and upstream channels in symmetric 10 Gbit/s EPON and the downstream channel in the 10/1 Gbit/s asymmetric EPON. Upstream channel in the asymmetric EPON is the same as in 1 Gbit/s EPON, an optional frame-based FEC using Reed-Solomon(255, 239).

=== Usable bandwidth ===
10G-EPON uses 64B/66B line coding, thus encoding overhead is just 3.125% compared to 25% encoding overhead that 1G-EPON has due to its use of 8b/10b encoding. The usable bandwidth in 10G-EPON is 10 Gbit/s out of a raw bandwidth of 10.3125 Gbit/s.

== Backward compatibility ==
The 10G-EPON standard defines a new physical layer, keeping the MAC, MAC Control and all the layers above unchanged to the greatest extent possible. This means that users of 10G-EPON can expect backward compatibility of network management system (NMS), PON-layer operations, administrations, and maintenance (OAM) system, DBA and scheduling, and so on.

=== Coexistence with 1G-EPON ===
The 802.3av standard places significant emphasis on enabling simultaneous operation of 1 Gbit/s and 10 Gbit/s EPON systems on the same outside plant. In the downstream direction, the 1 Gbit/s and 10 Gbit/s channels are separated in the wavelength domain, with 1 Gbit/s transmission limited to 1480–1500 nm band and 10 Gbit/s transmission using 1575–1580 nm band.

In the upstream direction, the 1 Gbit/s and 10 Gbit/s bands overlap. 1 Gbit/s band spreads from 1260 to 1360 nm; 10 Gbit/s band uses 1260 to 1280 nm band. This allows both upstream channels to share spectrum region characterized by low chromatic dispersion, but requires the 1 Gbit/s and 10 Gbit/s channels to be separated in time domain. Since burst transmissions from different ONUs now may have different line rates, this method is termed dual-rate TDMA.

Various OLT implementations may support 1 Gbit/s and 10 Gbit/s transmissions only downstream direction, only upstream direction, or in both downstream and upstream directions. The following table illustrates which ONU types are simultaneously supported by various OLT implementations:

OLT Implementation	Supported ONU types
Downstream: two wavelengths Upstream: single rate	(1) 1G-EPON ONU (2) 10/1G-EPON ONU
Downstream: single wavelength Upstream: dual rate	(1) 10/10G-EPON ONU (2) 10/1G-EPON ONU
Downstream: two wavelengths Upstream: dual rate	(1) 1G-EPON ONU (2) 10/1G-EPON ONU (3) 10/10G-EPON ONU

== See also ==
- 10G-PON
- Ethernet in the first mile
