= EPON Protocol over Coax =

EPON Protocol over Coax, or EPoC, refers to the transparent extension of an Ethernet passive optical network (EPON) over a cable operator's hybrid fiber-coax (HFC) network. From the service provider's perspective the use of the coax portion of the network is transparent to EPON protocol operation in the optical line terminal (OLT) thereby creating a unified scheduling, management, and quality of service (QoS) environment that includes both the optical and coax portions of the network. The IEEE 802.3 Ethernet Working Group initiated a standards process with the creation of an EPoC Study Group in November 2011. EPoC adds to the family of IEEE 802.3 Ethernet in the first mile (EFM) standards.

== Standards ==
The Institute of Electrical and Electronics Engineers (IEEE) 802.3 standards committee published standards for a symmetric 1 Gbit/s EPON network, originally published in September 2004 as IEEE 802.3ah-2004, and a 10 Gbit/s EPON network permitting symmetric 10 Gbit/s and asymmetric 10 Gbit/s downstream 1 Gbit/s upstream, originally published in June 2009 as IEEE 802.3av-2009 also known as 10G-EPON.

A Call For Interest (CFI) group process was initiated in May 2011 by Broadcom after receiving requests for initiating EPoC standardization in IEEE from Chinese cable operators and then also by North American cable operators. Many companies became involved in the CFI creation and consensus process. According to the CFI materials, representatives from the following companies supported the formation of the study group: Alcatel-Lucent, Aurora Networks, Bright House Networks, Broadcom, Cogeco Cable Inc., CableLabs, Comcast, Cox Networks, Dell, Fiberhome Telecommunication Technologies, Harmonic Inc., Hewlett-Packard, High Speed Design, Huawei, Neophotonics, PMC-Sierra, Qualcomm, Sumitomo Electric Industries, Technical Working Committee of China Radio & TV Association, Time Warner Cable, Wuhan Yangtze Optical Technologies Co. Ltd., and ZTE. In November 2011, the "EPON PHY for Coax" CFI was presented to the IEEE 802.3 Working Group plenary and the creation of the EPoC Study Group (SG) was approved.

In May 2012, the EPoC Study Group completed its draft Project Authorization Request (PAR), its "5 Criteria" responses, and a set of objectives for further work. These materials require review and approval by the IEEE 802.3 Working Group, the IEEE 802 LAN/MAN Standards Committee (LMSC), and the IEEE New Standards Committee (NesCom). Upon receiving approval, the EPoC Study Group will transition to the EPoC Task Force (TF) and then will begin its work that leads directly to creating the draft standard.

On 30 August 2012, the IEEE-SA approved the PAR permitting the IEEE 802.3 Working Group to charter the IEEE P802.3bn Task Force.

== Architecture ==
IEEE 802.3 standards apply to media access control (MAC) sublayer and Physical sublayer specifications, and their respective management, only. For EPON, IEEE 802.3 defined separately a service provider MAC and PHY called an Optical Line Terminal (OLT) and a subscriber MAC and Physical sublayer called an Optical Network Unit (ONU). The medium interconnecting the OLT with the ONU is a fiber optical cable in which two wavelengths are defined for full-duplex operation, one for continuous downstream channel operation (OLT transmitting to one or more ONUs), and another for upstream burst mode channel operation that permits OLT-controlled time-division sharing of the upstream channel amongst all ONUs on the PON.

Similarly, the EPoC architecture consists of a service provider Coax Line Terminal (CLT) and a subscriber Coax Network Unit (CNU). The intent is the CLT MAC sublayer is the same as the OLT MAC sublayer and the CNU MAC sublayer is the same as the ONU MAC sublayer. The optical physical sublayer and fiber optical media have been replaced with a coax physical sublayer and a coaxial distribution network (CxDN) media. For the coax media, downstream and upstream communication channels utilize Radio Frequency (RF) spectrum as assigned and made available by a cable operator on the coax network. In the case of a coax network, the medium-dependent interface (MDI) is typically the industry standard "F" connector.

IEEE 802.3 standards do not describe implementations or system solutions. The use of OLT, CLT, ONU, and CNU in the standard will apply to their respective MAC and Physical sublayers only.

== System Models ==
Two system models have been under discussion in the IEEE 802.3 EPoC Study Group. The first is the direct output of the IEEE 802.3 EPoC standardization effort: i.e., a CLT with one more CNUs interconnected by a coaxial distribution network. The second is enabled by a future EPoC standard, but is outside the scope of the IEEE 802.3 Working Group. That is a traditional EPON deployment consisting of an OLT device and one or more ONU devices attached to the same PON with one or more new devices referred to functionally as an optical to Coax Media Converter (CMC) that attach one side to the PON and the other to a CxDN with their associated CNUs, where the communications over the coax media follows the EPoC standard. The intent of the second model is to permit an OLT to transparently manage the collection of ONU and CNU devices in a similar fashion; e.g. unified EPON management, scheduling, and quality of service. This second model is viewed as extending an Ethernet PON onto coax.

Given the likely shorter reach of coax, if CLT's are developed they are likely to be used in FTTB applications with the CLT in the building with EPoC to tenants. A second possibility is an outside plant (e.g. strand mounted or cabinet based) CLT which would be FTTC.
