= Wellfleet Communications =

American networking equipment manufacturer

Wellfleet Communications, Inc.
- Type: Public
- Traded as: Nasdaq: WFLT
- Industry: Networking equipment
- Founded: June 1986
- Defunct: October 1994
- Fate: Merged with SynOptics Communications
- Successor: Bay Networks
- Headquarters: Billerica, Massachusetts, US
- Key people: CEO Paul Severino

Wellfleet Communications, Inc., was an Internet router company founded in 1986 by Paul Severino, Bill Seifert, Steven Willis, Jennifer Lamonakis, and David Rowe based in Bedford, Massachusetts, and later Billerica, Massachusetts. In an attempt to more effectively compete with Cisco Systems, its chief rival, it merged in October, 1994 with SynOptics Communications of Santa Clara, California to form Bay Networks in a deal worth US$ 2.7B. Bay Networks would in turn be acquired by Nortel in June, 1998 for US$ 9.1B.

Wellfleet was ranked the fastest-growing company in the United States by Fortune Magazine in both 1992 and 1993. Wellfleet sold routers.

Wellfleet also emphasized on support of the up-and-coming Internet Protocol. In 1991, Cisco led the global multi-protocol router market with a 51% share, whereas Wellfleet was third with only 9% market share. By 1993, Wellfleet had grown to a 14% market share, second only to Cisco's 50%. Wellfleet concluded the best way to gain strategic positioning over Cisco would be to merge with hub manufacturer SynOptics. By combining these technologies, the joined companies could provide their customers with common product interfaces and network management tools.

The resulting merged company, Bay Networks (named as such because Wellfleet was based in Boston, Massachusetts and SynOptics in San Francisco, California, two classic bay cities).
