= Aeluros =

- Company type: Private company
- Industry: Semiconductors
- Founded: June 2001
- Headquarters: Mountain View, California, The USA
- Products: Ethernet Integrated Circuits
- Number of employees: 50
- Website: www.aeluros.com

Aeluros Inc was a semiconductor company developing integrated circuits for wireline communications - for Ethernet operating at 10 Gigabits per second. The company was founded in 2001, and produced physical layer ICs used in 10 Gigabit Ethernet line cards and optical modules (such as XENPAK, SFP, XFP).

== Overview ==
Aeluros was the first to produce a XAUI transceiver dissipating less than 1 Watt of power, a transceiver that can drive directly a 10 Gbit/s VCSEL, and a transceiver with integrated electronic dispersion compensation for 10 Gigabit Ethernet using Multi-mode optical fiber.

== Acquisition ==
Aeluros merged with NetLogic Microsystems in October 2007 in a deal exceeding $70M. Netlogic Microsystems was subsequently acquired by Broadcom in February 2012 for $3.7B.
