= PAF Public School =

PAF Public School may refer to:

- PAF Public School Sargodha, a Pakistan Air Force operated boarding school in Sargodha, Pakistan
- PAF Public School Lower Topa, a Pakistan Air Force operated boarding school in Murree, Pakistan
