= 100BaseVG =

Ethernet variant

100BaseVG is a 100 Mbit/s Ethernet standard specified to run over four pairs of Category 3 cable (cable also known as voice grade, hence the "VG"). It is also called 100VG-AnyLAN because it was defined to carry both Ethernet and Token Ring frame types.

100BaseVG was originally proposed by Hewlett-Packard, ratified by the IEEE in 1995 and was practically extinct by 1998. In 2001 IEEE recorded the status of its 100BaseVG standard as being a "Withdrawn Standard" (defined as "A standard which is no longer maintained and which may contain significant obsolete or erroneous information.")

== Standardization ==
100BaseVG started in the IEEE 802.3 committee as Fast Ethernet. One faction wanted to keep carrier-sense multiple access with collision detection (CSMA/CD) in order to keep it pure Ethernet, even though the collision domain problem limited the distances to one tenth that of 10BASE-T. Another faction wanted to change to a polling architecture from the hub (they called it "Demand Priority Protocol") in order to maintain the 10BASE-T distances, and also to make it a deterministic protocol. The first faction argued that, since IEEE 802.3 was the Ethernet committee, it was not the place to develop a different protocol. Thus, the IEEE 802.12 committee was formed and standardized 100BaseVG.

== Physical layer ==
The physical layer requires four twisted pairs of "voice-grade" cabling for a link, so Category 3 cables or better can be used. While control signaling uses two pairs for each direction simultaneously, all four pairs are switched to a single direction during data transmission, as required and defined during control signaling. This makes 100BaseVG an inherently half-duplex medium like e.g. 10BASE5 (yet faster) but without the CSMA/CD drawbacks.

100BaseVG also supports full-duplex operation over optical fiber or over two pairs of shielded twisted pair.

Comparison of twisted-pair-based Ethernet physical transport layers (TP-PHYs)
Name	Standard	Status	Speed (Mbit/s)	Pairs required	Lanes per direction	Bits per hertz	Line code	Symbol rate per lane (MBd)	Bandwidth	Max distance (m)	Cable	Cable rating (MHz)	Usage
100BaseVG	802.12-1995	obsolete	100	4	4	1.6̅	5B6B Half-duplex only	30	15	100	Cat 3	16	Market failure

== 100VG-AnyLAN vs. Fast Ethernet ==
=== Multiplexing ===
Instead of following the Fast Ethernet standard for twisted pair cabling by using only 2 pairs of wires, 100VG-AnyLAN used all four pairs in either Category 3 or Category 5 twisted pair cable. The design goals were to avoid the radio frequency radiation emitted at the higher frequencies required by Fast Ethernet and to leverage existing wiring installations of Category 3 cabling that most organizations had recently installed to support 10 megabit twisted-pair Ethernet. This had the additional advantage of being less susceptible to external sources of RF interference such as other network cables, fluorescent lights, and high power lines. They multiplexed the signal across all 8 wires thereby lowering the frequency and making it more robust. This presented a problem with early installations that borrowed one unused twisted pair for telephone traffic but those installations were uncommon.

=== Deterministic ===
When Ethernet became Fast Ethernet, it continued to use the CSMA/CD mechanism to manage traffic on the network cable. 100VG took advantage of the token passing concept that made ARCNET and Token Ring popular in order to provide consistent performance no matter how large the network became. It removed the token passing responsibility from the wiring and network nodes and placed it internal to the 100VG-AnyLAN hubs. These hubs contained the rotating token that never left the hub itself. When a node wanted to transmit data, it would raise a bit on its hub port connection that indicated to the hub that it was ready. As the token passed by a ready hub port, it would then open up traffic to that node. Because the token stayed within the hub, it did not have to traverse long cables going to every node as in ARCNET and Token Ring, thereby becoming faster than those other deterministic networking standards and being less susceptible to cabling problems, network card failures, and line interference. Real-life load testing showed 100VG-AnyLAN reaching 95% of its theoretical network speed instead of about 45% as in Fast Ethernet when using hubs. Fast Ethernet switches were not commonplace at first because of high cost and limited availability so, initially, 100VG had a significant performance advantage.

=== Demand Priority ===
Certain workloads demand their data be delivered at particular times - video and audio are good examples. On lightly used networks this traffic can be sent as normal data, but on busy networks, retransmission delays can push delivery outside the jitter limits of the data.

VG introduced the concept of Demand Priority to address this problem. When a node requests the ability to send data, it indicates this has high or normal priority. High-priority data is given transmission permission as soon as possible, typically as soon as any current data packet is completed. By letting the hub manage access, the architecture can guarantee required bandwidth and requested service priority to particular applications or nodes. It also can guarantee that the network can be scaled up (enlarged) without loss of bandwidth.
