= SynOptics =

American networking equipment manufacturer

SynOptics Communications, Inc.
- Type: Public
- Traded as: Nasdaq: SNPX
- Industry: Networking equipment
- Founded: 1985
- Defunct: October 1994
- Fate: Merged with Wellfleet Communications
- Successor: Bay Networks
- Headquarters: Santa Clara, California, US
- Key people: Andrew K. Ludwick, Founder and CEO

SynOptics Communications, Inc., was a Santa Clara, California-based early computer network equipment vendor from 1985 until 1994. SynOptics popularized the concept of the modular Ethernet hub and high-speed Ethernet networking over copper twisted-pair and fiber optic cables.

== History ==
SynOptics Communications was founded in 1985 by Andrew K. Ludwick and Ronald V. Schmidt, both of whom worked at Xerox's Palo Alto Research Center (PARC). The most significant product that Synoptics produced was LattisNet (originally named AstraNet) in 1987. This meant that unshielded twisted-pair cabling already installed in office buildings could be re-utilized for computer networking instead of special coaxial cables. The star network topology made the network much easier to manage and maintain. Together these two innovations directly led to the ubiquity of Ethernet networks.

Before the final standard version of what is known today as the 10BASE-T protocol, there were several different methods and standards for running Ethernet over twisted-pair cabling at various speeds, such as StarLAN. LattisNet was similar to the final 10BASE-T protocol except that it had slightly different voltage and signal characteristics. Synoptics updated their product line to the 10BASE-T specification once it was published.

Through the late 1980s and into the early 1990s, SynOptics produced a series of innovative products including early 10BASE-2 hubs, pre-standard (LattisNet), and 100BASE-TX products.

The company was the market leader in Ethernet LAN hubs over rivals 3Com and Cabletron. Despite intense competition that drove down prices, Synoptics' annual revenue grew to a high of $700 million in 1993.

To move away from the rapidly commoditizing Layer 1/2 Ethernet equipment market and grow their market share in the increasingly lucrative and more profitable Layer 3 networking arena, SynOptics merged with Billerica, Massachusetts based Wellfleet Communications on July 6, 1994, in a US$ 2.7 Billion dollar deal to form Bay Networks. SynOptics headquarters at the time of the merger with Wellfleet was in the pair of strikingly-designed sloped buildings at the Northeast corner of the intersection of California's Great America Parkway and Mission College Blvd in Santa Clara, an area known for featuring numerous networking start-ups such as Ungermann-Bass. These buildings are currently occupied by Palo Alto Networks.

Bay Networks was acquired by Canadian company Nortel in June 1998 for $9.1 billion, forming Nortel Networks.

== See also ==
- SynOptics Network Management Protocol
