= Category 3 cable =

Unshielded twisted pair cable used in telephone wiring

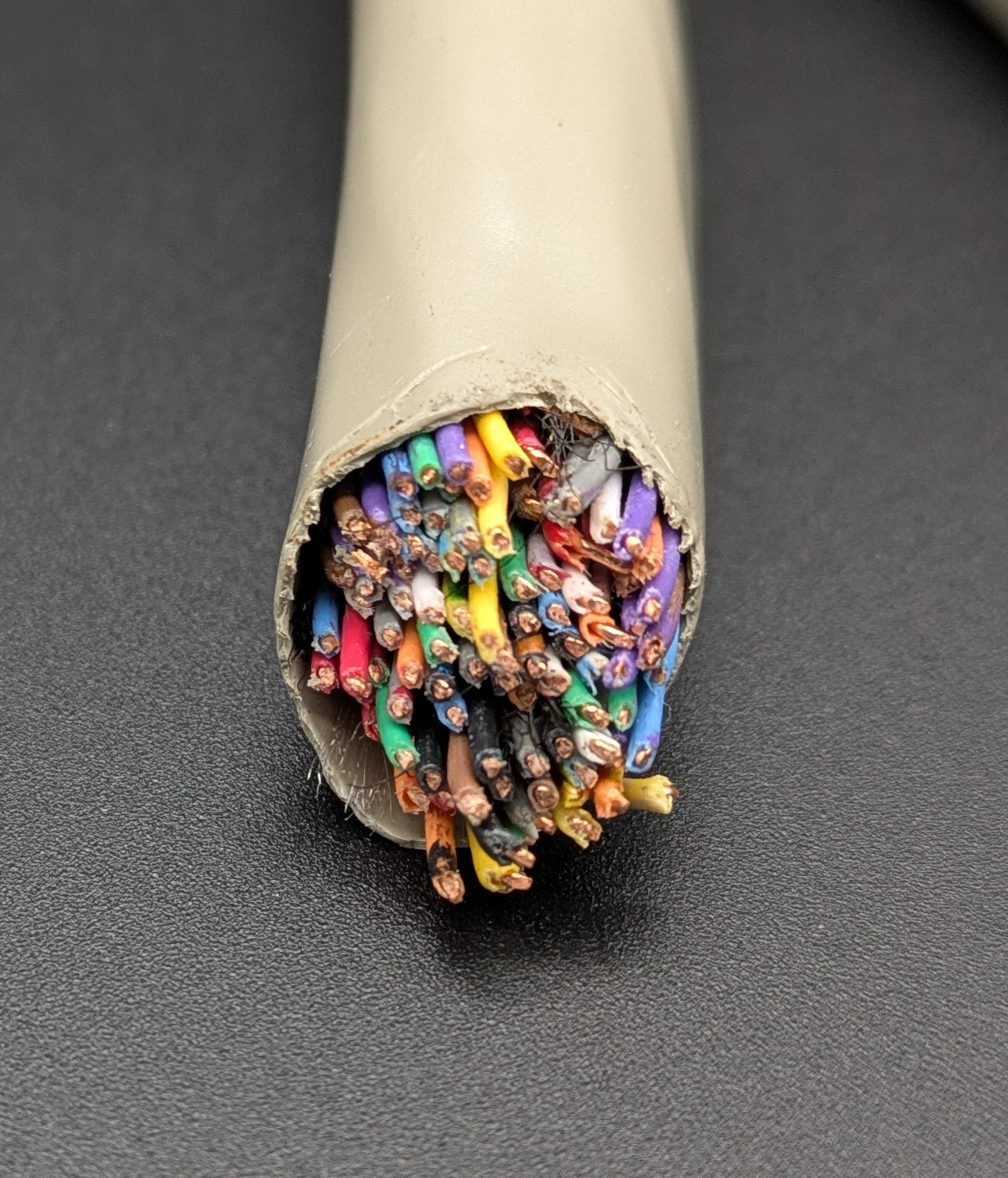
Cross section of a 25-pair category 3 cable

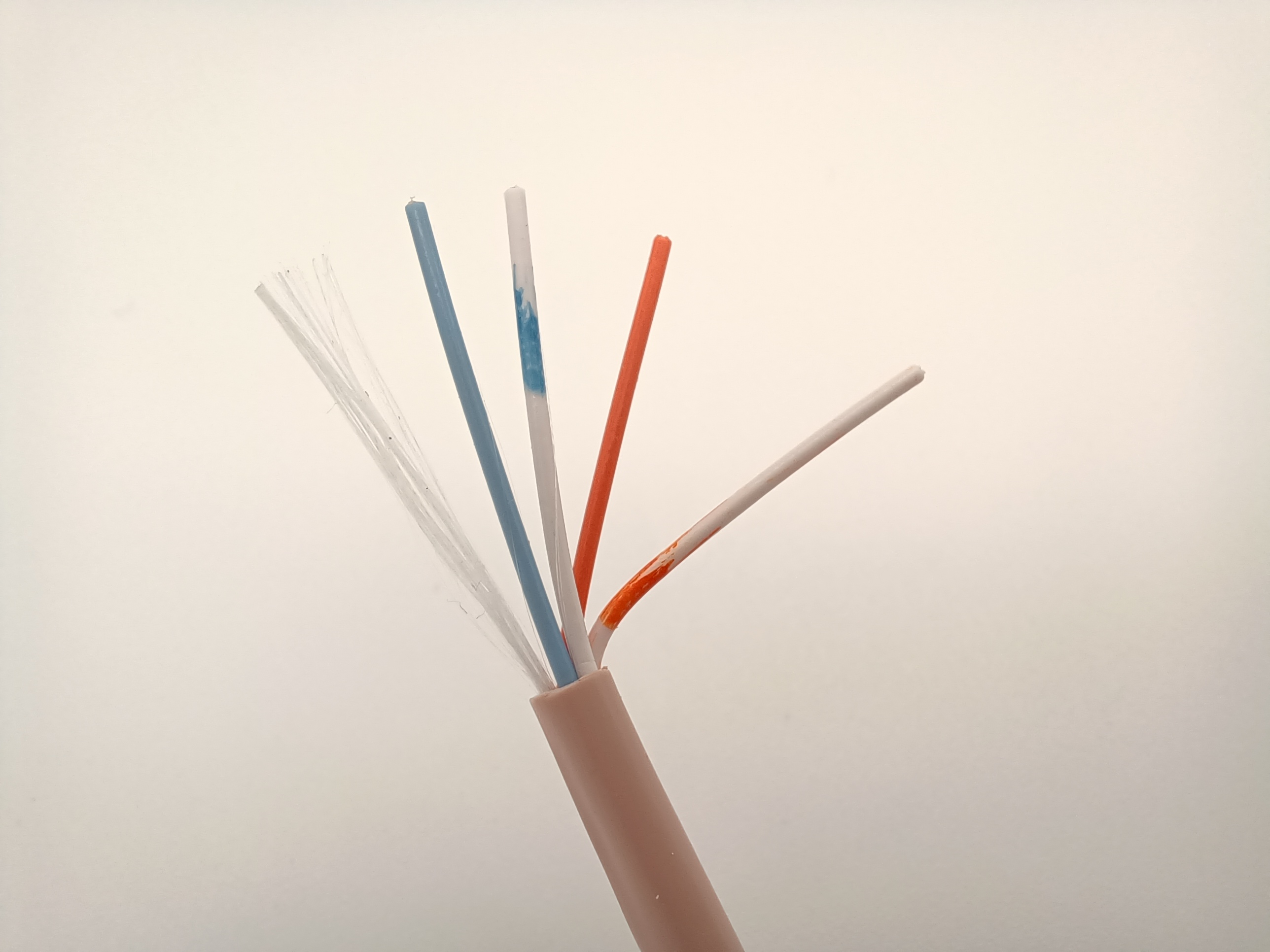
A two-pair Cat 3 cable

Category 3 cable, commonly known as Cat 3 or station wire, and less commonly known as VG or voice-grade (as, for example, in 100BaseVG), is an unshielded twisted pair (UTP) cable used in telephone wiring. It is part of a family of standards defined jointly by the Electronic Industries Alliance (EIA) and the Telecommunications Industry Association (TIA) and published in the TIA/EIA-568-B standard.

Although designed to reliably carry data up to 10 Mbit/s, modern data networks run at much higher speeds, and Cat 5e or better cable is generally used for new installations. Cat 3 cables may have 2, 3, 4, or more pairs.

== Networking ==
Cat 3 was widely used in computer networking in the early 1990s for 10BASE-T Ethernet and, to a much lesser extent, for 100BaseVG Ethernet, Token Ring and 100BASE-T4. The original Power over Ethernet 802.3af specification supports the use of Cat 3 cable, but the later 802.3at Type 2 high-power variation does not. In some use cases and for short distances, Cat 3 may be capable of carrying 100BASE-TX (2 pairs) or even 1000BASE-T (4 pairs). Such use cases include hobbyist retrofitting short home telephone Cat 3 networks for Ethernet.

Dedicated 100BASE-T4 networks, supporting 100 Mbit/s over Cat 3, appear to have been a rarity as very few network interface controllers and switches were ever released. Some examples include the 3com 3C250-T4 Superstack II HUB 100, IBM 8225 Fast Ethernet Stackable Hub and Intel LinkBuilder FMS 100 T4. The same applies to network interface controller cards. Bridging 100BASE-T4 with 100BASE-TX required additional network equipment.

== Replacement ==
Starting in the mid-1990s, new structured cabling installations were often built with the higher performing Cat 5e cable required by 100BASE-TX. Cat 5e or Cat 6 is now used for all modern structured cabling installations. Many large institutions have policies that any upgrade to a network using Cat 3 must involve upgrading to Cat 5e.

== See also ==
- Copper cable certification
