= LattisNet =

Family of networking equipment

LattisNet was a family of computer networking hardware and software products built and sold by SynOptics Communications (also rebranded by Western Digital) during the 1980s. Examples were the 1000, 2500 and 3000 series of LattisHub network hubs. LattisNet was the first implementation of 10 Megabits per second local area networking over unshielded twisted pair wiring in a star topology.

== Ethernet variants ==
During the early 1980s most networks used coaxial cable as the primary form of premises cabling in Ethernet implementations. In 1985 SynOptics shipped its first hub for fiber optics and shielded twisted pair. SynOptics' co-founder, Engineer Ronald V. Schmidt, had experimented with a fiber-optic variant of Ethernet called Fibernet II while working at Xerox PARC, where Ethernet had been invented. In January 1987 SynOptics announced intentions to manufacture equipment supporting 10 megabits/sec data transfer rates over unshielded twisted pair, telephone wire.

In August 1987 New York based LAN Systems, Inc. completed the equipment testing and praised SynOptics for successfully deploying a 10 Mbit/s network that supported workstations up to 330 feet from the wiring closet, because of their careful control of EMI and RFI. Novell reported that the LattisNet equipment performed better than RG-58U coaxial cable.

This same year HP proposed a study group be formed to look into standardizing Ethernet on telephone wires. SynOptics' investor, Menlo Ventures explained its position on joining the IEEE for standardization.

When we [Menlo Ventures] initially made the investment, SynOptics had a patent on this architecture, which Xerox Corporation had filed for them. [The patent] basically would have precluded anyone else from implementing Ethernet hubs. And so in one sense, you might look at this patent and say: 'That is a powerful barrier of entry. It will keep competitors away from the door.' Unfortunately, in the networking business [a central patent] works against you in that the IEEE will not allow any company to have a patent on something that is going to give that company an advantage, if the technology covered by the patent is to become an industry standard." So SynOptics had sort of a dilemma: If we retain the patent rights and defend our exclusivity, we basically have to give up the idea of becoming the industry standard. On the other hand, if we want to have our technology and architecture adopted as the industry standard, we basically have to throw our patent on the pile and offer a free license to anyone. So we decided to go for the standard and to give free license to the patent. By becoming the standard, the market acceptance of this technology would be dramatically increased. In fact, had we kept the proprietary standard, I believe someone else would have gone to the IEEE and a different approach would have been adopted, and we would have been left in the dust.

— Tom Bredt, July 2, 1995, The Triumph of Ethernet

In 1990 the IEEE issued an Ethernet over twisted pair standard known for transmitting 10 Mbit/s, or 10BASE-T (802.3i).

Comparison of twisted-pair-based Ethernet physical transport layers (TP-PHYs)
Name	Standard	Status	Speed (Mbit/s)	Pairs required	Lanes per direction	Bits per hertz	Line code	Symbol rate per lane (MBd)	Bandwidth	Max distance (m)	Cable	Cable rating (MHz)	Usage
LattisNet	pre 802.3i-1990	obsolete	10	2	1	1	PE	10	10	100	voice grade	~12	LAN

== Ethernet compatibility ==
Of the SynOptics hubs, the 2500 series was only compatible with LattisNet twisted-pair Ethernet; the 1000 and 3000 series featured modules for LattisNet and standard 10BASE-T. In the 1000 series, the 505 modules are LattisNet and the 508 modules are 10BASE-T.
