= Bay Networks =

Former network hardware business enterprise

Bay Networks, Inc.
- Type: Public
- Traded as: NYSE: BAY (1996-1998); Nasdaq: BNET (1994-1996)
- Industry: Telecommunications
- Predecessor: Wellfleet Communications; SynOptics
- Founded: July 1994; 32 years ago
- Fate: Acquired by Northern Telecom
- Successor: Nortel Networks
- Headquarters: Billerica, Massachusetts, US; Santa Clara, California, US
- Area served: Worldwide
- Key people: Paul Severino; Andy Ludwick; Dave House
- Products: Router Products Technology, Network Management, Remote Access Servers, Internet/Intranet CPE & Applications, Data Over Cable Products, Digital Signal Processing Technology
- Members: Dave House, Ex-CEO
- Website: baynetworks.com at the Wayback Machine (archived 1996-10-29)

Bay Networks, Inc., was a network hardware vendor formed through the merger of Santa Clara, California, based SynOptics Communications and Billerica, Massachusetts based Wellfleet Communications on July 6, 1994. SynOptics was an important early innovator of Ethernet products, having developed a pre-standard twisted pair 10 Mbit/s Ethernet product and a modular Ethernet hub product that dominated the enterprise networking market. Wellfleet was an important competitor to Cisco Systems in the router market, ultimately commanding up to a 20% market share of the network router business worldwide. The combined company was renamed Bay Networks, as SynOptics was based in the San Francisco Bay Area and Wellfleet in Greater Boston, nearby to Massachusetts Bay.

== Acquisitions ==
Bay Networks expanded its product line both through internal development and acquisition, acquiring the following companies during the course of its existence:

- Centillion Networks, Inc. (May, 1995) – Provided Asynchronous Transfer Mode switching and Token Ring technology.
- Xylogics, Inc. (December, 1995) – Remote access technologies.
- Performance Technology (March, 1996) – LAN-to-WAN access technology.
- ARMON Networking, Ltd. (July, 1996) – RMON and RMON2 network management technology.
- LANcity Corporation (October, 1996) – Cable modem technology.
- Penril Datability Networks (November, 1996) – Dial-up modems and remote access products based on Digital Signal Processing technology.
- NetICs, Inc. (December, 1996) – ASIC-based Fast Ethernet switching technology.
- ISOTRO Network Management, Inc. (April, 1997) – DNS and DHCP technologies.
- Rapid City Communications (June, 1997) – Gigabit Ethernet switching and routing technology.
- New Oak Communications (January, 1998) – Provided VPN technology to Bay Networks product line.
- Netsation Corp. (February, 1998) – Technology was used to augment Bay Networks Optivity network management system.
- NetServe GmbH (July, 1998) – VoIPX technology

== Acquisition by Nortel ==
Bay Networks was acquired by Northern Telecom in June 1998 for US$ 9.1 billion, broadening Nortel's reach from its traditional carrier customer base into enterprise data networking. Reflective of this expanded product set and market, Nortel renamed itself Nortel Networks after the merger. In December 2009, as part of its bankruptcy proceedings, Nortel sold its Enterprise Networking equipment and software business to Avaya. The sale included a few remaining Bay Networks products that were still active in Nortel's portfolio at the time of the sale, such as the Ethernet Switch 450 and Backbone Concentrator Node (BCN) router.

The Bay Networks product Small office/home office line survives to this day as the Netgear products that are widely sold by electronics retailers. Example products include Gigabit Ethernet switches, cable modems, print servers, and similar inexpensive, consumer-oriented networking equipment. Bay Networks had originally launched Netgear as a product line/division in January 1996, but the product line was not core to the newly formed Nortel Networks operations and so was spun out as a standalone company in September 1999.
