= Network topology =

Arrangement of a communication network

Network topology is the arrangement of the elements (links, nodes, etc.) of a communication network. Network topology can be used to define or describe the arrangement of various types of telecommunication networks, including command and control radio networks, industrial fieldbusses and computer networks.

Network topology is the topological structure of a network and may be depicted physically or logically. It is an application of graph theory wherein communicating devices are modeled as nodes and the connections between the devices are modeled as links or lines between the nodes. Physical topology is the placement of the various components of a network (e.g., device location and cable installation), while logical topology illustrates how data flows within a network. Distances between nodes, physical interconnections, transmission rates, or signal types may differ between two different networks, yet their logical topologies may be identical. A network's physical topology is a particular concern of the physical layer of the OSI model.

Examples of network topologies are found in local area networks (LAN), a common computer network installation. Any given node in the LAN has one or more physical links to other devices in the network; graphically mapping these links results in a geometric shape that can be used to describe the physical topology of the network. A wide variety of physical topologies have been used in LANs, including ring, bus, mesh and star. Conversely, mapping the data flow between the components determines the logical topology of the network. In comparison, Controller Area Networks, common in vehicles, are primarily distributed control system networks of one or more controllers interconnected with sensors and actuators over, invariably, a physical bus topology.

== Topologies ==
Diagram of different network topologies

Two basic categories of network topologies exist: physical topologies and logical topologies.

The transmission medium layout used to link devices is the physical topology of the network. For conductive or fiber optical mediums, this refers to the layout of cabling, the locations of nodes, and the links between the nodes and the cabling. The physical topology of a network is determined by the capabilities of the network access devices and media, the level of control or fault tolerance desired, and the cost associated with cabling or telecommunication circuits.

In contrast, logical topology is the way that the signals act on the network media, or the way that the data passes through the network from one device to the next without regard to the physical interconnection of the devices. A network's logical topology is not necessarily the same as its physical topology. For example, the original twisted pair Ethernet using repeater hubs was a logical bus topology carried on a physical star topology. Token Ring is a logical ring topology, but is wired as a physical star from the media access unit. Physically, Avionics Full-Duplex Switched Ethernet (AFDX) can be a cascaded star topology of multiple dual redundant Ethernet switches; however, the AFDX virtual links are modeled as time-switched single-transmitter bus connections, thus following the safety model of a single-transmitter bus topology previously used in aircraft. Logical topologies are often closely associated with media access control methods and protocols. Some networks are able to dynamically change their logical topology through configuration changes to their routers and switches.

== Links ==
The transmission media (often referred to in the literature as the physical media) used to link devices to form a computer network include electrical cables (Ethernet, HomePNA, power line communication, G.hn), optical fiber (fiber-optic communication), and radio waves (wireless networking). In the OSI model, these are defined at layers 1 and 2 — the physical layer and the data link layer.

A widely adopted family of transmission media used in local area network (LAN) technology is collectively known as Ethernet. The media and protocol standards that enable communication between networked devices over Ethernet are defined by IEEE 802.3. Ethernet transmits data over both copper and fiber cables. Wireless LAN standards (e.g., those defined by IEEE 802.11) use radio waves, or others use infrared signals as a transmission medium. Power line communication uses a building's power cabling to transmit data.

=== Wired technologies ===
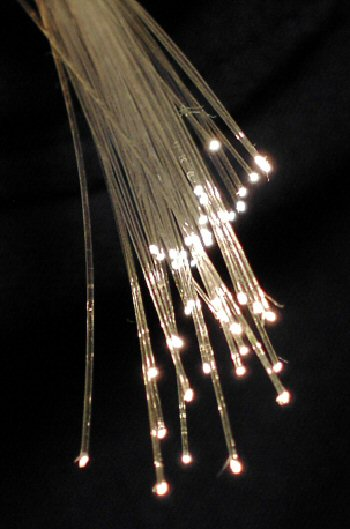
Fiber-optic cables are used to transmit light from one computer/network node to another.

The orders of the following wired technologies are, roughly, from slowest to fastest transmission speed.

- Coaxial cable is widely used for cable television systems, office buildings, and other work-sites for local area networks. The cables consist of copper or aluminum wire surrounded by an insulating layer (typically a flexible material with a high dielectric constant), which itself is surrounded by a conductive layer. The insulation between the conductors helps maintain the characteristic impedance of the cable, which can help improve its performance. Transmission speed ranges from 200 million bits per second to more than 500 million bits per second.
- ITU-T G.hn technology uses existing home wiring (coaxial cable, phone lines and power lines) to create a high-speed (up to 1 Gigabit/s) local area network.
- Signal traces on printed circuit boards are common for board-level serial communication, particularly between certain types of integrated circuits, a common example being SPI.
- Ribbon cable (untwisted and possibly unshielded) has been a cost-effective medium for serial protocols, especially within metallic enclosures or rolled within copper braid or foil, over short distances, or at lower data rates. Several serial network protocols can be deployed without shielded or twisted pair cabling, that is, with flat or ribbon cable, or a hybrid flat and twisted ribbon cable, should EMC, length, and bandwidth constraints permit: RS-232, RS-422, RS-485, CAN, GPIB, SCSI, etc.
- Twisted pair wire is the most widely used medium for all telecommunication. Twisted-pair cabling consists of copper wires that are twisted into pairs. Ordinary telephone wires consist of two insulated copper wires twisted into pairs. Computer network cabling (wired Ethernet as defined by IEEE 802.3) consists of 4 pairs of copper cabling that can be utilized for both voice and data transmission. The use of two wires twisted together helps to reduce crosstalk and electromagnetic induction. The transmission speed ranges from 2 million bits per second to 10 billion bits per second. Twisted pair cabling comes in two forms: unshielded twisted pair (UTP) and shielded twisted pair (STP). Each form comes in several category ratings, designed for use in various scenarios.

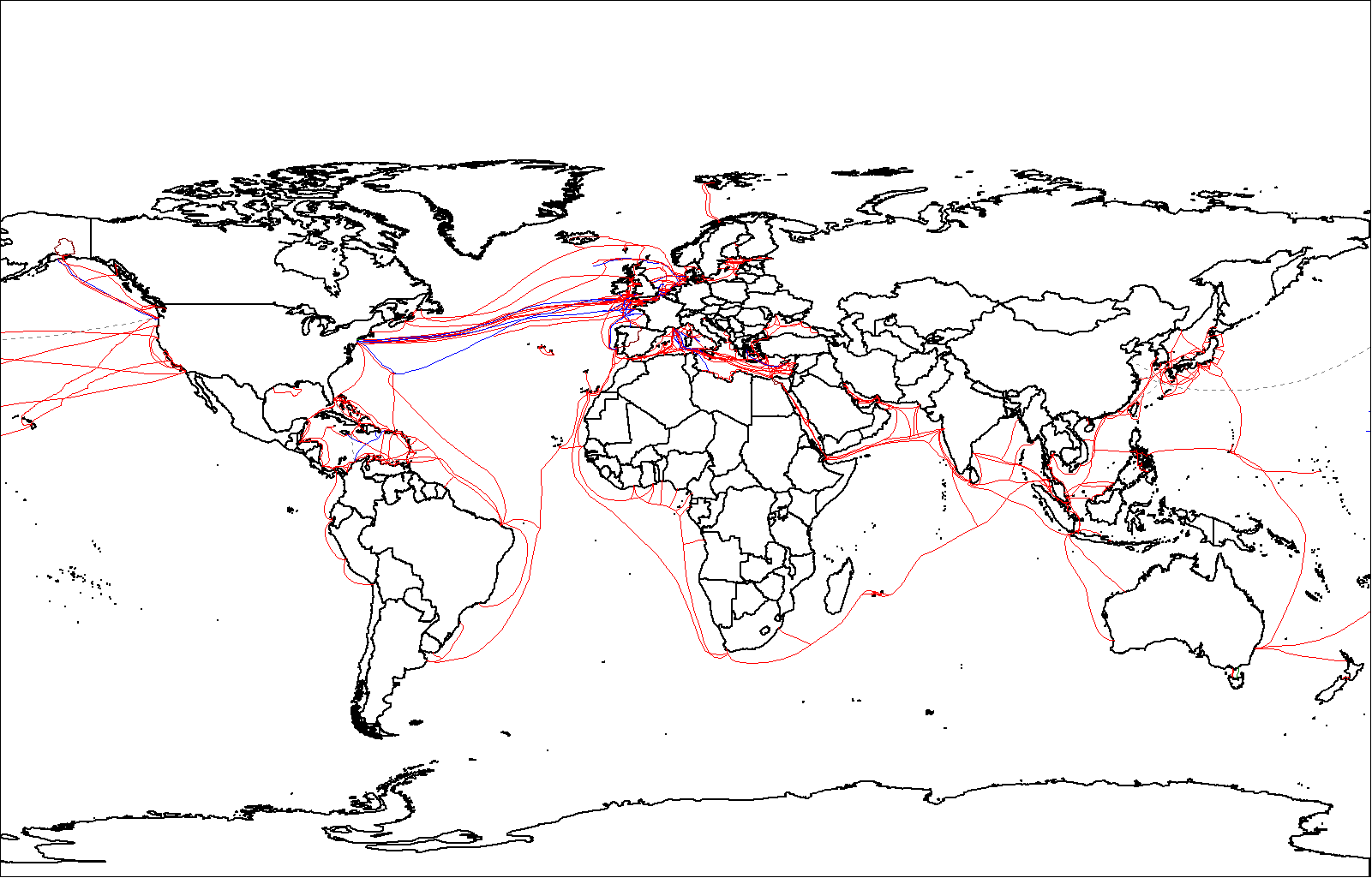
2007 map showing submarine optical fiber telecommunication cables around the world

- An optical fiber is a glass fiber. It carries pulses of light that represent data. Some advantages of optical fibers over metal wires are very low transmission loss and immunity from electrical interference. Optical fibers can simultaneously carry multiple wavelengths of light, which greatly increases the rate at which data can be sent, and helps enable data rates of up to trillions of bits per second. Optic fibers can be used for long runs of cable carrying very high data rates, and are used for undersea communications cables to interconnect continents.

Price is a main factor distinguishing wired and wireless technology options in a business. Wireless options command a price premium that can make purchasing wired computers, printers and other devices a financial benefit. Before making the decision to purchase hard-wired technology products, a review of the restrictions and limitations of the selections is necessary. Business and employee needs may override any cost considerations.

=== Wireless technologies ===
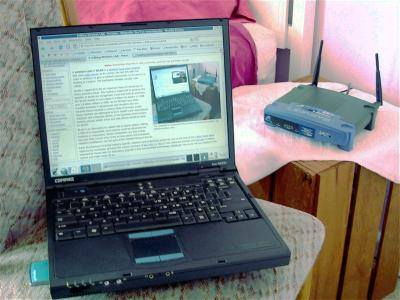
Personal computers are very often connected to networks using wireless links.

- Terrestrial microwave – Terrestrial microwave communication uses Earth-based transmitters and receivers resembling satellite dishes. Terrestrial microwaves are in the low gigahertz range, which limits all communications to line-of-sight. Relay stations are spaced approximately 50 km (30 mi) apart.
- Communications satellites – Satellites communicate via microwave radio waves, which are not deflected by the Earth's atmosphere. The satellites are stationed in space, typically in geostationary orbit 35,786 km (22,236 mi) above the equator. These Earth-orbiting systems are capable of receiving and relaying voice, data, and TV signals.
- Cellular and PCS systems use several radio communications technologies. The systems divide the region covered into multiple geographic areas. Each area has a low-power transmitter or radio relay antenna device to relay calls from one area to the next area.
- Radio and spread spectrum technologies – Wireless local area networks use a high-frequency radio technology similar to digital cellular and a low-frequency radio technology. Wireless LANs use spread-spectrum technology to enable communication between multiple devices in a limited area. IEEE 802.11 defines a common flavor of open-standard wireless radio-wave technologies known collectively as Wi-Fi.
- Free-space optical communication uses visible or invisible light for communications. In most cases, line-of-sight propagation is used, which limits the physical positioning of communicating devices.

=== Exotic technologies ===
There have been various attempts at transporting data over exotic media:

- IP over Avian Carriers was a humorous April fool's Request for Comments, issued as RFC 1149. It was implemented in real life in 2001.
- Extending the Internet to interplanetary dimensions via radio waves, the Interplanetary Internet.

Both cases have a large round-trip delay time, which gives slow two-way communication, but does not prevent sending large amounts of information.

== Nodes ==
Network nodes are the points of connection of the transmission medium to transmitters and receivers of the electrical, optical, or radio signals carried in the medium. Nodes may be associated with a computer, but certain types may have only a microcontroller at a node or possibly no programmable device at all. In the simplest of serial arrangements, one RS-232 transmitter can be connected by a pair of wires to one receiver, forming two nodes on one link, or a point-to-point topology. Some protocols permit a single node to only either transmit or receive (e.g., ARINC 429). Other protocols have nodes that can both transmit and receive into a single channel (e.g., CAN can have many transceivers connected to a single bus). While the conventional system building blocks of a computer network include network interface controllers (NICs), repeaters, hubs, bridges, switches, routers, modems, gateways, and firewalls, most address network concerns beyond the physical network topology and may be represented as single nodes on a particular physical network topology.

=== Network interfaces ===
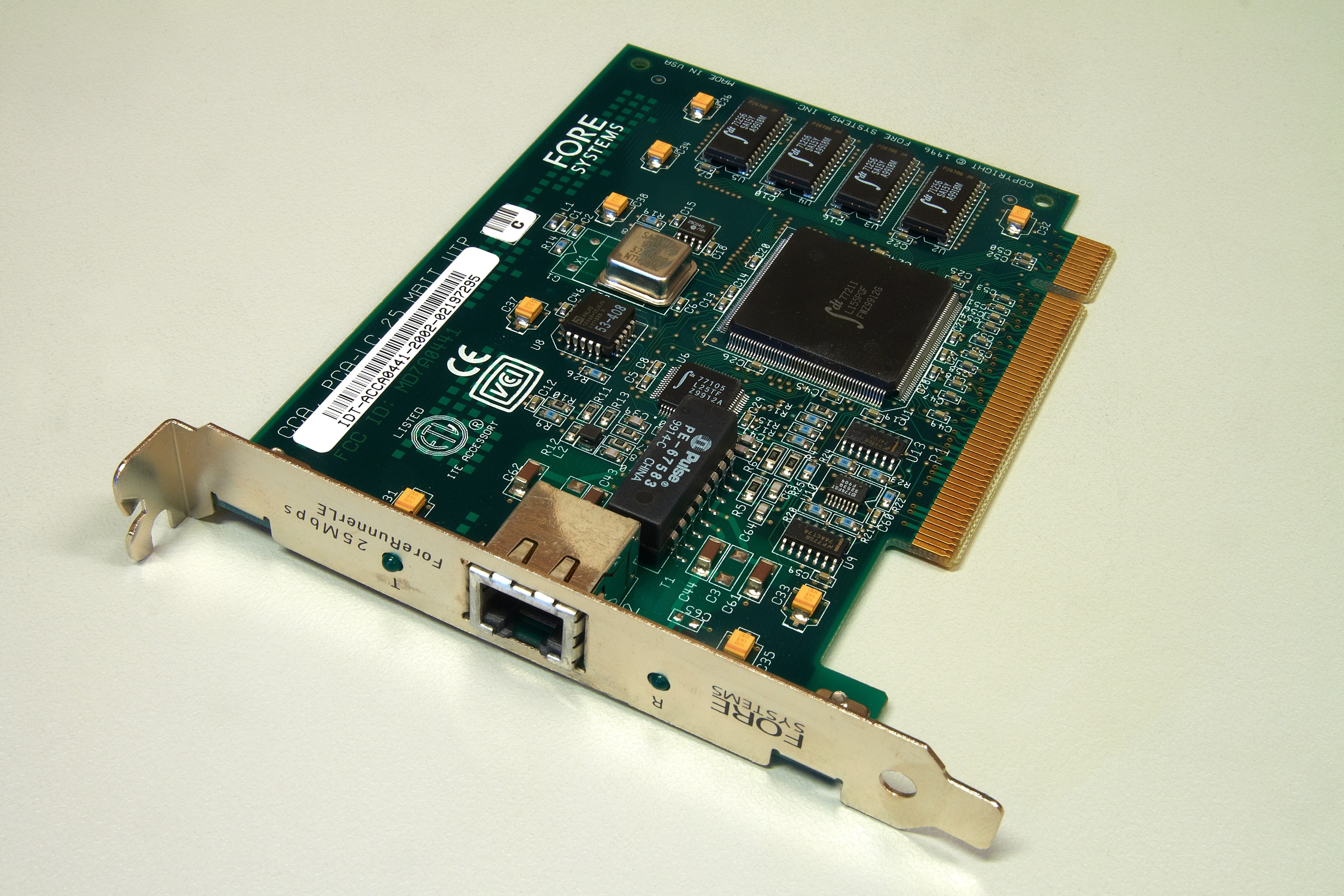
An ATM network interface in the form of an accessory card. A lot of network interfaces are built-in.

A network interface controller (NIC) is computer hardware that provides a computer with the ability to access the transmission media, and has the ability to process low-level network information. For example, the NIC may have a connector for accepting a cable, or an aerial for wireless transmission and reception, and the associated circuitry.

The NIC responds to traffic addressed to a network address for either the NIC or the computer as a whole.

In Ethernet networks, each network interface controller has a unique Media Access Control (MAC) address—usually stored in the controller's permanent memory. To avoid address conflicts between network devices, the Institute of Electrical and Electronics Engineers (IEEE) maintains and administers MAC address uniqueness. The size of an Ethernet MAC address is six octets. The three most significant octets are reserved to identify NIC manufacturers. These manufacturers, using only their assigned prefixes, uniquely assign the three least-significant octets of every Ethernet interface they produce.

=== Repeaters and hubs ===
A repeater is an electronic device that receives a network signal, cleans it of unnecessary noise and regenerates it. The signal may be reformed or retransmitted at a higher power level, to the other side of an obstruction, possibly using a different transmission medium, so that the signal can cover longer distances without degradation. Commercial repeaters have extended RS-232 segments from 15 meters to over a kilometer. In most twisted pair Ethernet configurations, repeaters are required for cable that runs longer than 100 meters. With fiber optics, repeaters can be tens or even hundreds of kilometers apart.

Repeaters work within the physical layer of the OSI model; that is, there is no end-to-end change in the physical protocol across the repeater, or repeater pair, even if a different physical layer may be used between the ends of the repeater, or repeater pair. Repeaters require a small amount of time to regenerate the signal. This can cause a propagation delay that affects network performance and may affect proper function. As a result, many network architectures limit the number of repeaters that can be used in a row, e.g., the Ethernet 5-4-3 rule.

A repeater with multiple ports is known as hub, an Ethernet hub in Ethernet networks, a USB hub in USB networks.

- USB networks use hubs to form tiered-star topologies.
- Ethernet hubs and repeaters in LANs have been mostly obsoleted by modern switches.

=== Bridges ===
A network bridge connects and filters traffic between two network segments at the data link layer (layer 2) of the OSI model to form a single network. This breaks the network's collision domain but maintains a unified broadcast domain. Network segmentation breaks down a large, congested network into an aggregation of smaller, more efficient networks.

Bridges come in three basic types:

- Local bridges: Directly connect LANs
- Remote bridges: Can be used to create a wide area network (WAN) link between LANs. Remote bridges, where the connecting link is slower than the end networks, have largely been replaced with routers.
- Wireless bridges: Can be used to join LANs or connect remote devices to LANs.

=== Switches ===
A network switch is a device that forwards and filters OSI layer 2 datagrams (frames) between ports based on the destination MAC address in each frame. A switch is distinct from a hub in that it only forwards the frames to the physical ports involved in the communication, rather than all ports connected. It can be thought of as a multi-port bridge. It learns to associate physical ports to MAC addresses by examining the source addresses of received frames. If an unknown destination is targeted, the switch broadcasts to all ports but the source. Switches normally have numerous ports, facilitating a star topology for devices and cascading additional switches.

Multi-layer switches are capable of routing based on layer 3 addressing or additional logical levels. The term switch is often used loosely to include devices such as routers and bridges, as well as devices that may distribute traffic based on load or based on application content (e.g., a Web URL identifier).

=== Routers ===
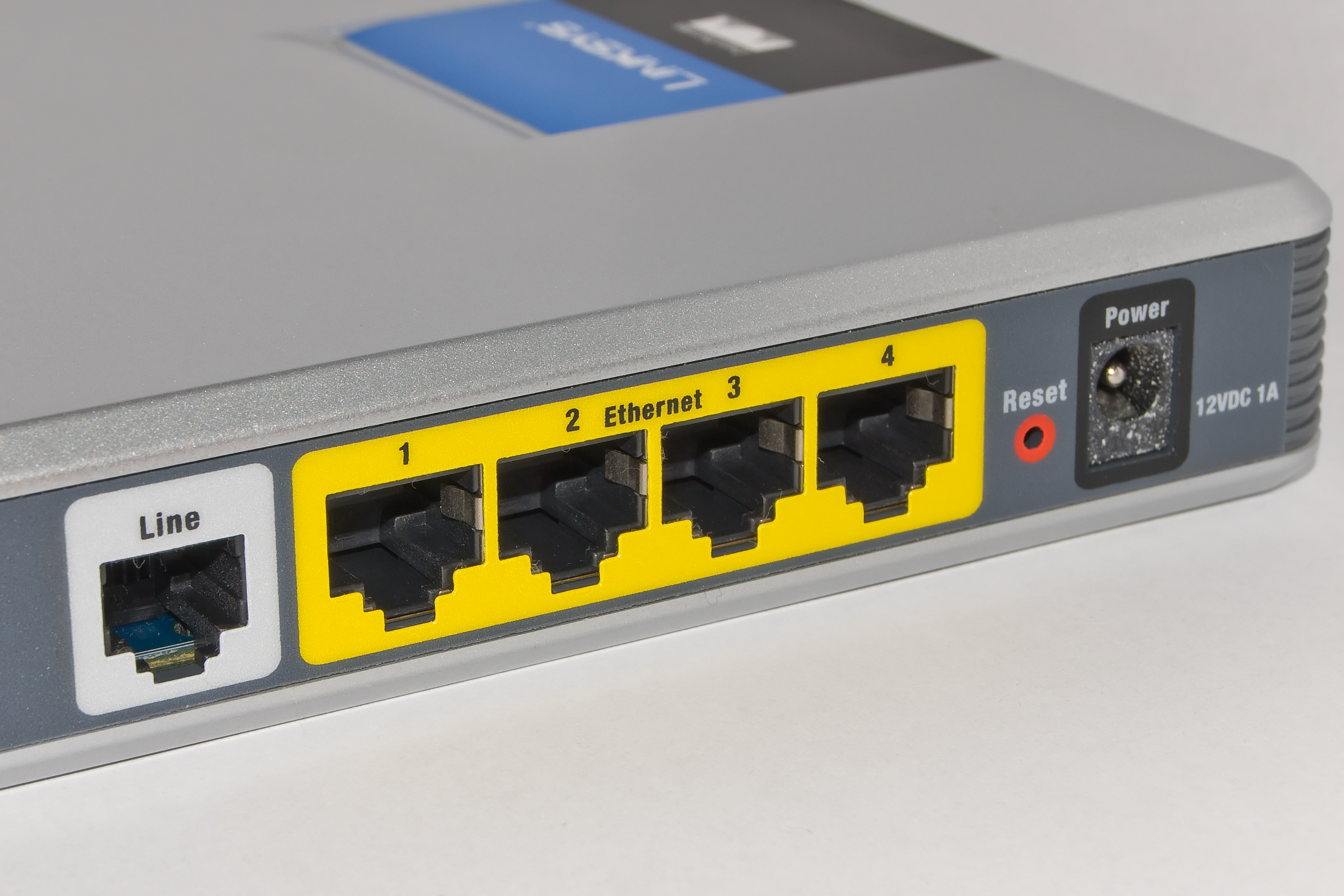
A typical home or small office router showing the ADSL telephone line and Ethernet network cable connections

A router is an internetworking device that forwards packets between networks by processing the routing information included in the packet or datagram (Internet protocol information from layer 3). The routing information is often processed in conjunction with the routing table (or forwarding table). A router uses its routing table to determine where to forward packets. A destination in a routing table can include a black hole because data can go into it; however, no further processing is done for said data, i.e., the packets are dropped.

=== Modems ===
Modems (MOdulator-DEModulator) are used to connect network nodes via wire not originally designed for digital network traffic, or for wireless. To do this, one or more carrier signals are modulated by the digital signal to produce an analog signal that can be tailored to give the required properties for transmission. Modems are commonly used for telephone lines, using a digital subscriber line technology.

=== Firewalls ===
A firewall is a network device for controlling network security and access rules. Firewalls are typically configured to reject access requests from unrecognized sources while allowing actions from recognized ones. The vital role firewalls play in network security grows in parallel with the constant increase in cyber attacks.

== Classification ==
The study of network topology recognizes eight basic topologies: point-to-point, bus, star, ring or circular, mesh, tree, hybrid, or daisy chain.

=== Point-to-point ===
The simplest topology with a dedicated link between two endpoints. Easiest to understand of the variations of point-to-point topology is a point-to-point communication channel that appears, to the user, to be permanently associated with the two endpoints. A child's tin can telephone is one example of a physical dedicated channel.

Using circuit-switching or packet-switching technologies, a point-to-point circuit can be set up dynamically and dropped when no longer needed. Switched point-to-point topologies are the basic model of conventional telephony.

The value of a permanent point-to-point network is unimpeded communications between the two endpoints. The value of an on-demand point-to-point connection is proportional to the number of potential pairs of subscribers and has been expressed as Metcalfe's Law.

=== Daisy chain ===
Daisy chaining is accomplished by connecting each computer in series to the next. If a message is intended for a computer partway down the line, each system bounces it along in sequence until it reaches the destination. A daisy-chained network can take two basic forms: linear and ring.

- A linear topology puts a two-way link between one computer and the next. However, this was expensive in the early days of computing, since each computer (except for the ones at each end) required two receivers and two transmitters.
- By connecting the computers at each end of the chain, a ring topology can be formed. When a node sends a message, the message is processed by each computer in the ring. An advantage of the ring is that the number of transmitters and receivers can be cut in half. Since a message will eventually loop all of the way around, transmission does not need to go both directions. Alternatively, the ring can be used to improve fault tolerance. If the ring breaks at a particular link, then the transmission can be sent via the reverse path, thereby ensuring that all nodes are always connected in the case of a single failure.

=== Bus ===
Bus network topology

In local area networks using bus topology, each node is connected by interface connectors to a single central cable. This is the 'bus', also referred to as the backbone, or trunk – all data transmission between nodes in the network is transmitted over this common transmission medium and is able to be received by all nodes in the network simultaneously.

A signal containing the address of the intended receiving machine travels from a source machine in both directions to all machines connected to the bus until it finds the intended recipient, which then accepts the data. If the machine address does not match the intended address for the data, the data portion of the signal is ignored. Since the bus topology consists of only one wire, it is less expensive to implement than other topologies, but the savings are offset by the higher cost of managing the network. Additionally, since the network is dependent on the single cable, it can be the single point of failure of the network. In this topology, data being transferred may be accessed by any node.

==== Linear bus ====
In a linear bus network, all of the nodes of the network are connected to a common transmission medium, which has just two endpoints. When the electrical signal reaches the end of the bus, the signal is reflected back down the line, causing unwanted interference. To prevent this, the two endpoints of the bus are normally terminated with a device called a terminator.

==== Distributed bus ====
In a distributed bus network, all of the nodes of the network are connected to a common transmission medium with more than two endpoints, created by adding branches to the main section of the transmission medium – the physical distributed bus topology functions in exactly the same fashion as the physical linear bus topology because all nodes share a common transmission medium.

=== Star ===
Star network topology

In star topology (also called hub-and-spoke), every peripheral node (computer workstation or any other peripheral) is connected to a central node called a hub or switch. The hub is the server and the peripherals are the clients. The network does not necessarily have to resemble a star to be classified as a star network, but all of the peripheral nodes on the network must be connected to one central hub. All traffic that traverses the network passes through the central hub, which acts as a signal repeater.

The star topology is considered the easiest topology to design and implement. One advantage of the star topology is the simplicity of adding additional nodes. The primary disadvantage of the star topology is that the hub represents a single point of failure. Also, since all peripheral communication must flow through the central hub, the aggregate central bandwidth forms a network bottleneck for large clusters.

==== Extended star ====
The extended star network topology extends a physical star topology by one or more repeaters between the central node and the peripheral (or 'spoke') nodes. The repeaters are used to extend the maximum transmission distance of the physical layer, the point-to-point distance between the central node and the peripheral nodes. Repeaters allow greater transmission distance, further than would be possible using just the transmitting power of the central node. The use of repeaters can also overcome limitations from the standard upon which the physical layer is based.

A physical extended star topology in which repeaters are replaced with hubs or switches is a type of hybrid network topology and is referred to as a physical hierarchical star topology, although some texts make no distinction between the two topologies.

A physical hierarchical star topology can also be referred as a tier-star topology. This topology differs from a tree topology in the way star networks are connected together. A tier-star topology uses a central node, while a tree topology uses a central bus and can also be referred to as a star-bus network.

==== Distributed star ====
A distributed star is a network topology that is composed of individual networks that are based upon the physical star topology connected in a linear fashion – i.e., daisy-chained – with no central or top level connection point (e.g., two or more stacked hubs, along with their associated star connected nodes or spokes).

=== Ring ===
Ring network topology

A ring topology is a daisy chain in a closed loop. Data travels around the ring in one direction. When one node sends data to another, the data passes through each intermediate node on the ring until it reaches its destination. The intermediate nodes repeat (retransmit) the data to keep the signal strong. Every node is a peer; there is no hierarchical relationship of clients and servers. If one node is unable to retransmit data, it severs communication between the nodes before and after it in the bus.

Advantages:

- When the load on the network increases, its performance is better than bus topology.
- There is no need for a network server to control the connectivity between workstations.

Disadvantages:

- Aggregate network bandwidth is bottlenecked by the weakest link between two nodes.

=== Mesh ===
The value of fully meshed networks is proportional to the exponent of the number of subscribers, assuming that communicating groups of any two endpoints, up to and including all the endpoints, is approximated by Reed's Law.

==== Fully connected network ====
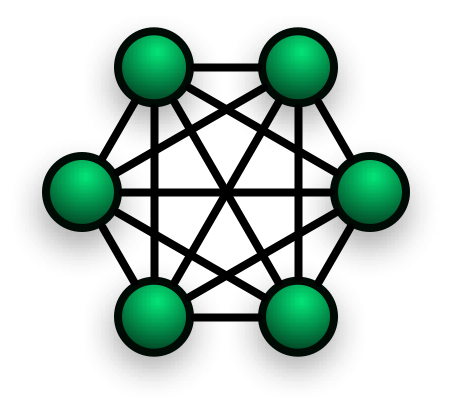
Fully connected mesh topology

In a fully connected network, all nodes are interconnected. (In graph theory this is called a complete graph.) The simplest fully connected network is a two-node network. A fully connected network doesn't need to use packet switching or broadcasting. However, since the number of connections grows quadratically with the number of nodes:

$c= \frac{n(n-1)}{2}.\,$

This makes it impractical for large networks. This kind of topology does not trip and affect other nodes in the network.

==== Partially connected network ====
Partially connected mesh topology

In a partially connected network, certain nodes are connected to exactly one other node, but some nodes are connected to two or more other nodes with a point-to-point link. This makes it possible to make use of some of the redundancy of mesh topology that is physically fully connected, without the expense and complexity required for a connection between every node in the network.

=== Hybrid ===
Hybrid topology is also known as hybrid network. Hybrid networks combine two or more topologies in such a way that the resulting network does not exhibit one of the standard topologies (e.g., bus, star, ring, etc.). For example, a tree network (or star-bus network) is a hybrid topology in which star networks are interconnected via bus networks. However, a tree network connected to another tree network is still topologically a tree network, not a distinct network type. A hybrid topology is always produced when two different basic network topologies are connected.

A star-ring network consists of two or more ring networks connected using a multistation access unit (MAU) as a centralized hub.

Snowflake topology is meshed at the core, but tree shaped at the edges.

Two other hybrid network types are hybrid mesh and hierarchical star. Many supercomputing systems, such as those in the TOP500, have custom network architectures such as torus interconnect or dragonfly topology. Custom network topologies are possible depending on application. The spine-leaf architecture is common in hyperscale data centers.

== Centralization ==
The star topology reduces the probability of a network failure by connecting all of the peripheral nodes (computers, etc.) to a central node. When the physical star topology is applied to a logical bus network such as Ethernet, this central node (traditionally a hub) rebroadcasts all transmissions received from any peripheral node to all peripheral nodes on the network, sometimes including the originating node. All peripheral nodes may thus communicate with all others by transmitting to, and receiving from, the central node only. The failure of a transmission line linking any peripheral node to the central node will result in the isolation of that peripheral node from all others, but the remaining peripheral nodes will be unaffected. However, the disadvantage is that the failure of the central node will cause the failure of all of the peripheral nodes.

If the central node is passive, the originating node must be able to tolerate the reception of an echo of its own transmission, delayed by the two-way round trip transmission time (i.e. to and from the central node) plus any delay generated in the central node. An active star network has an active central node that usually has the means to prevent echo-related problems.

A tree topology (a.k.a. hierarchical topology) can be viewed as a collection of star networks arranged in a hierarchy. This tree structure has individual peripheral nodes (e.g., leaves) which are required to transmit to and receive from one other node only and are not required to act as repeaters or regenerators. Unlike the star network, the functionality of the central node may be distributed.

As in the conventional star network, individual nodes may thus still be isolated from the network by a single-point failure of a transmission path to the node. If a link connecting a leaf fails, that leaf is isolated; if a connection to a non-leaf node fails, an entire section of the network becomes isolated from the rest.

To alleviate the amount of network traffic that comes from broadcasting all signals to all nodes, more advanced central nodes were developed that are able to keep track of the identities of the nodes that are connected to the network. These network switches will learn the layout of the network by listening on each port during normal data transmission, examining the data packets and recording the address/identifier of each connected node and which port it is connected to in a lookup table held in memory. This lookup table then allows future transmissions to be forwarded to the intended destination only.

Daisy chain topology is a way of connecting network nodes in a linear or ring structure. It is used to transmit messages from one node to the next until they reach the destination node.

A daisy chain network can have two types: linear and ring. A linear daisy chain network is like an electrical series, where the first and last nodes are not connected. A ring daisy chain network is where the first and last nodes are connected, forming a loop.

== Decentralization ==
In a partially connected mesh topology, there are at least two nodes with two or more paths between them to provide redundant paths in case the link providing one of the paths fails. Decentralization is often used to compensate for the single-point-failure disadvantage that is present when using a single device as a central node (e.g., in star and tree networks). A special kind of mesh, limiting the number of hops between two nodes, is a hypercube. The number of arbitrary forks in mesh networks makes them more difficult to design and implement, but their decentralized nature makes them very useful.

This is similar in some ways to a grid network, where a linear or ring topology is used to connect systems in multiple directions. A multidimensional ring has a toroidal topology, for instance.

A fully connected network, complete topology, or full mesh topology is a network topology in which there is a direct link between all pairs of nodes. In a fully connected network with n nodes, there are $\frac{n(n-1)}{2}\,$ direct links. Networks designed with this topology are usually very expensive to set up, but provide a high degree of reliability due to the multiple paths for data that are provided by the large number of redundant links between nodes. This topology is mostly seen in military applications.

== See also ==
- Broadcast communication network
- Butterfly network – Network topology for parallel computers
- Computer network diagram – Schematic of nodes and connections in a network
- Gradient network
- Internet topology
- Network simulation – Simulating computer networks
- Relay network
- Rhizome (philosophy) – Philosophical model of the connections present in an assemblage
- Scale-free network – Network whose degree distribution follows a power law
- Shared mesh – Mesh network configuration
- Switched communication network – Switched connections are used for two non-adjacent nodes
- Switched mesh
