= Tree network =

Hybrid network topology

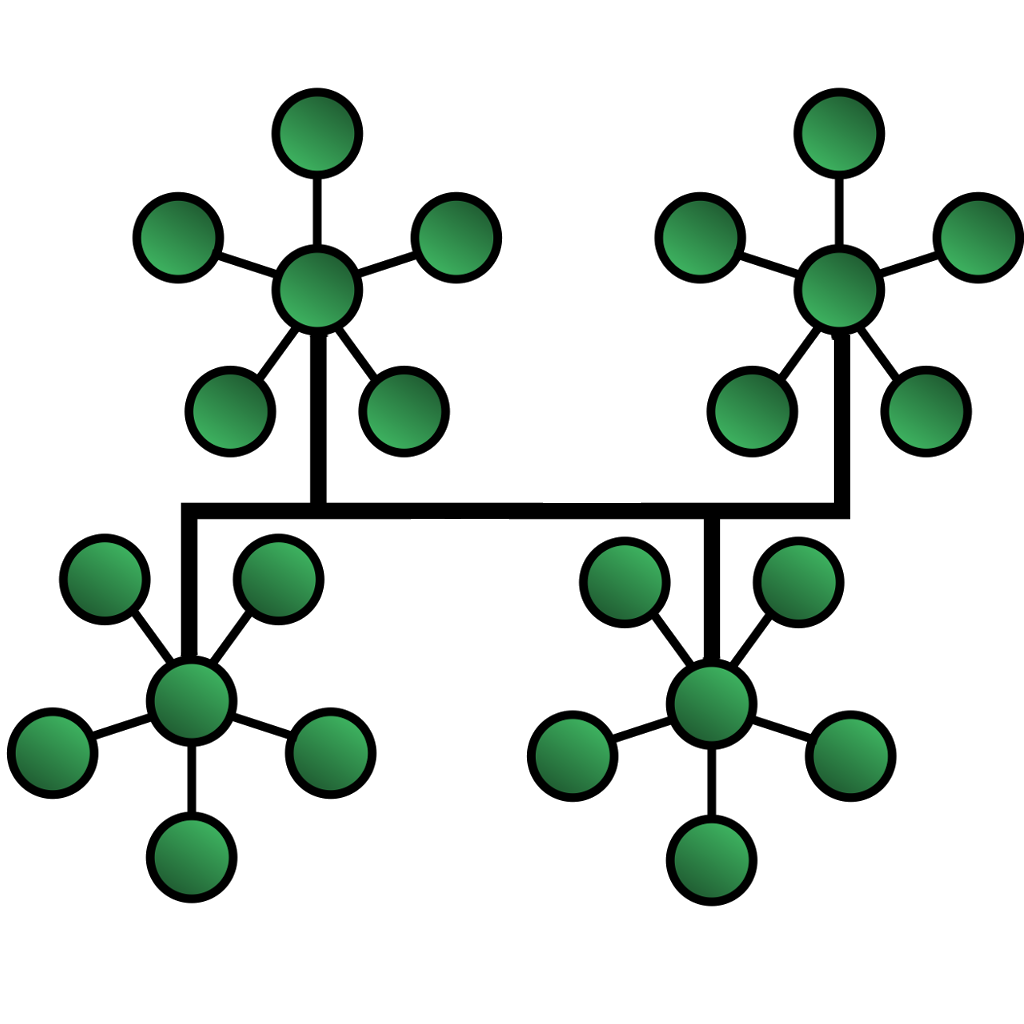
Tree network topology

A tree topology, or star-bus topology, is a hybrid network topology in which star networks are interconnected via bus networks. Tree networks are hierarchical, and each node can have an arbitrary number of child nodes.

== Regular tree networks ==
A regular tree network's topology is characterized by two parameters: the branching, $d$, and the number of generations, $G$. The total number of the nodes, $N$, and the number of peripheral nodes $N_p$, are given by

$$N= \frac{d^{G+1}-1}{d-1},\quad N_p=d^G$$

== Random tree networks ==
Three parameters are crucial in determining the statistics of random tree networks: first, the branching probability; second, the maximum number of allowed progenies at each branching point; and third, the maximum number of generations that a tree can attain. There are a lot of studies that address large tree networks; however, small tree networks are seldom studied.

== Tools to deal with networks ==
A group at MIT has developed a set of functions for Matlab that can help in analyzing networks. These tools could be used to study tree networks as well.

L. de Weck, Oliver. "MIT Strategic Engineering Research Group (SERG), Part II".
