= Media access unit =

Token Ring network hub

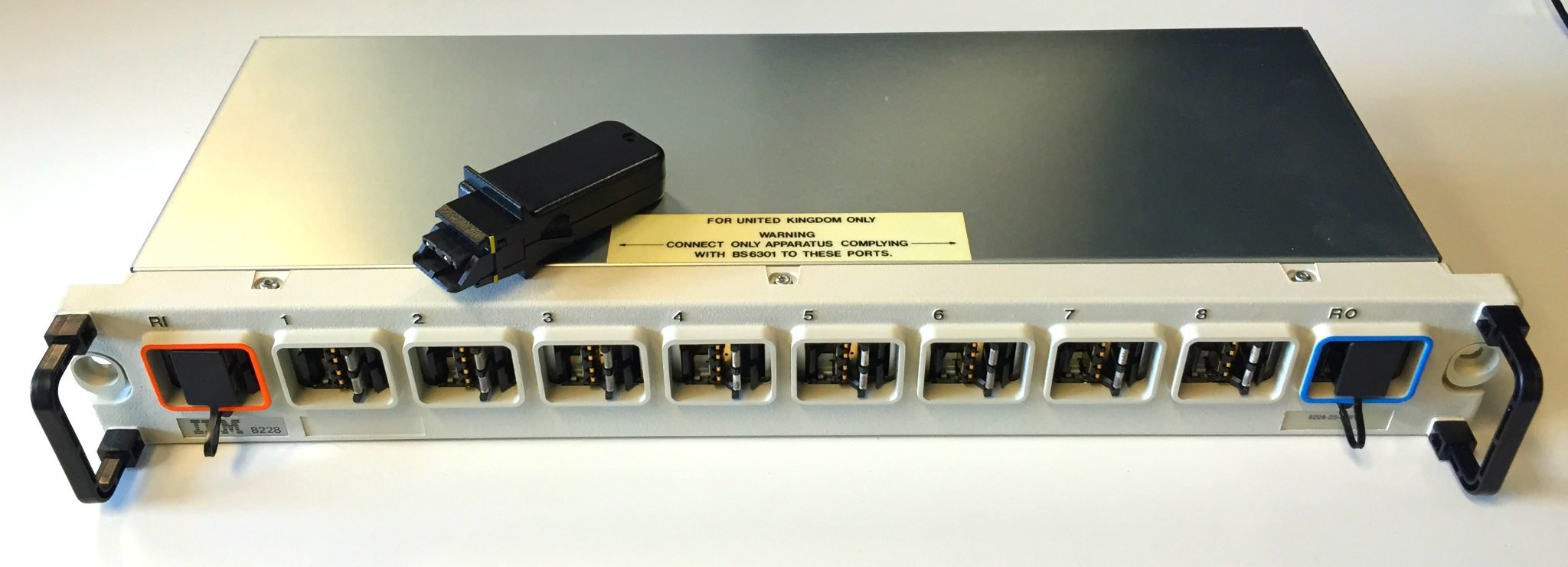
An IBM 8228 Multistation Access Unit with accompanying Setup Aid

Data flow though a 3-station Token Ring network built using a single MAU

A media access unit (MAU), also known as a multistation access unit (MAU or MSAU), is a device to attach multiple network stations in a ring topology when the cabling is done in a star topology as a Token Ring network, internally wired to connect the stations into a logical ring (generally passive i.e. non-switched and unmanaged; however managed Token Ring MAUs do exist in the form of CAUs, or Controlled Access Units).

Passive Token Ring was an active IBM networking product in the 1997 time frame, after which it was rapidly displaced by switched networking.

== Advantages and disadvantages ==
=== Passive networking without power ===
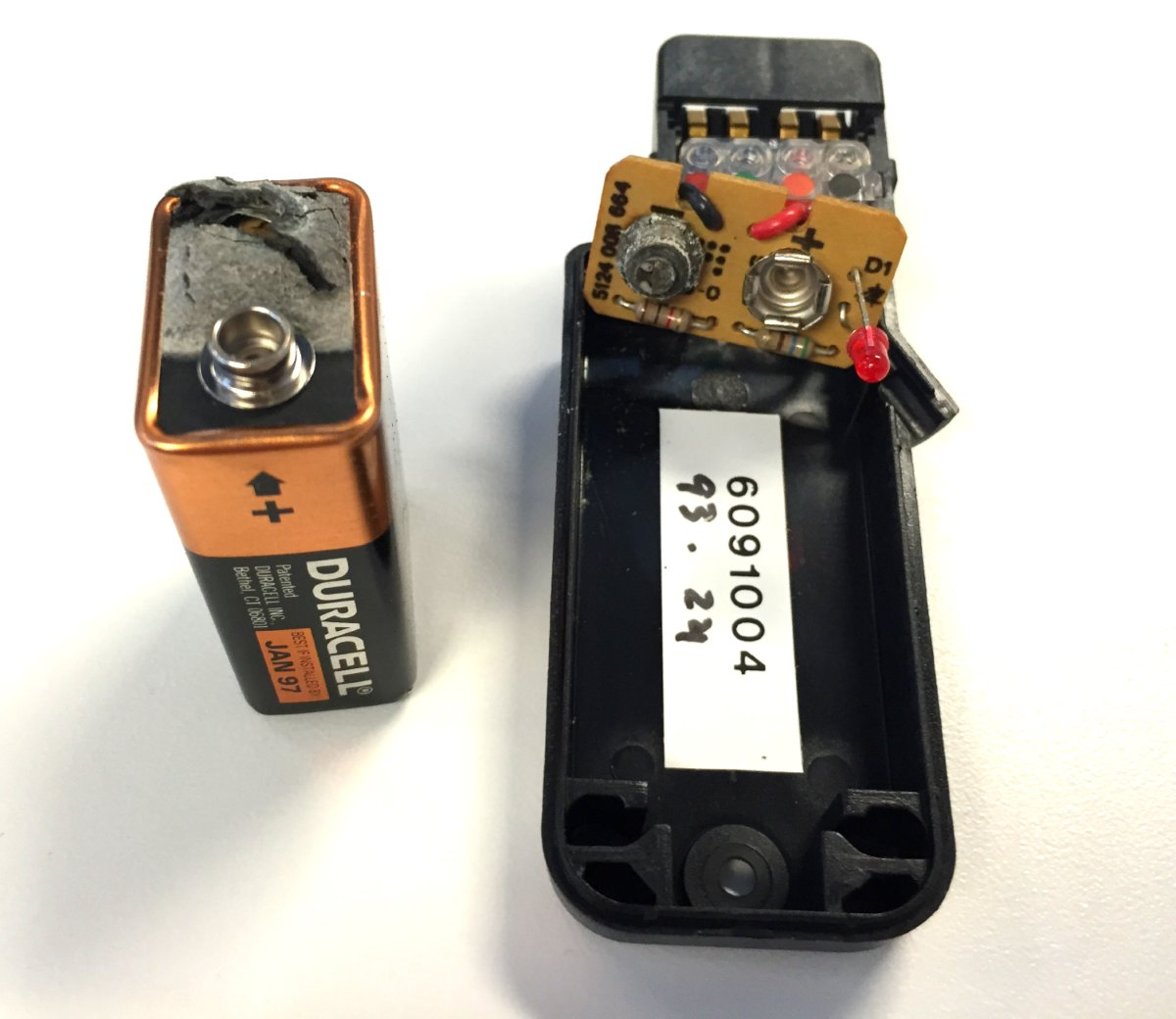
An IBM 8228 Setup Aid opened and battery removed

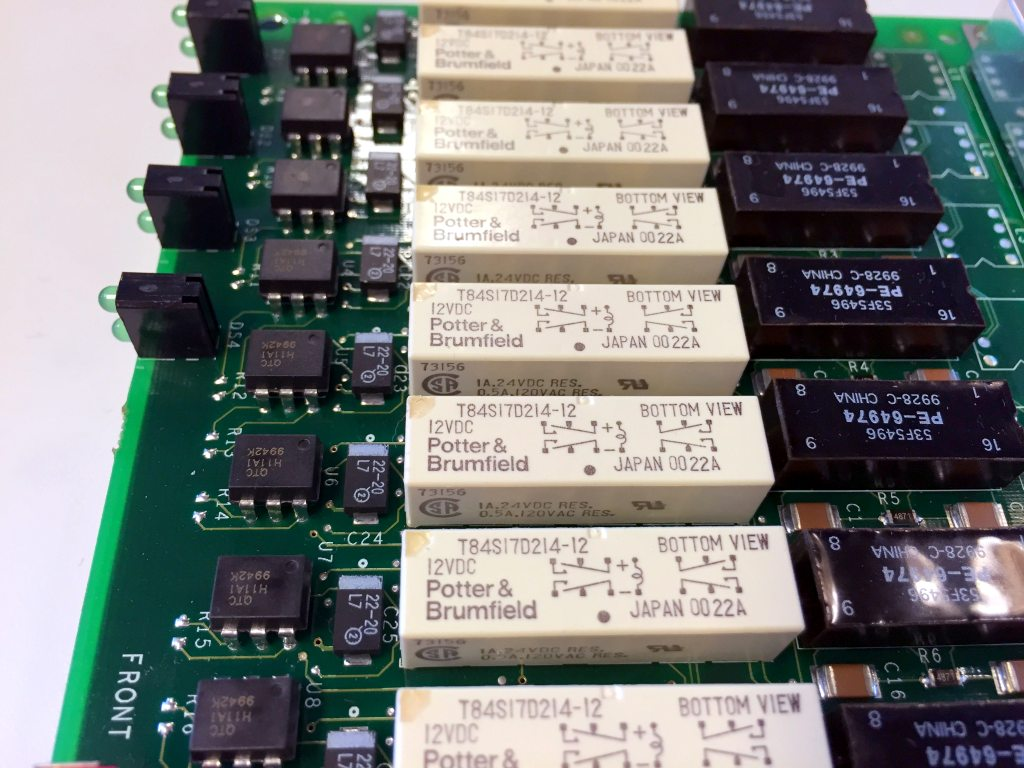
Relays found on the 8226 MAU circuit board

The majority of IBM-implemented (actual) passive Token Ring MAUs operated without the requirement of power; instead, the passive MAU used a series of relays that adjusted themselves as data is passed through: this is also why Token Ring generally used relays to terminate disconnected or failed ports. The power-less IBM 8228 Multistation Access Unit requires a special 'Setup Aid' tool to re-align the relays after the unit has been moved, which causes them to be in incorrect states: this is accomplished by a 9-volt battery sending a charge to snap the relays back in a proper state. The advantages of having a MAU operate without power is that they can be placed in areas without outlets; the disadvantage is that they must be primed each time the internal relays experience excessive force. The IBM 8226 MAU, while containing a power jack, primarily uses this for the LEDs; relays are still used inside the unit but do not require priming.

=== Bandwidth ===
In theory, this networking technology supported large geographic areas (with a total ring circumference of several kilometers). But with the bandwidth shared by all stations, in practice separate networks spanning smaller areas were joined using bridges. This bridged network technology was soon displaced by high-bandwidth switched networks.

== Fault tolerance ==
Multistation Access Units contain relays to short out non-operating stations. Multiple MAUs can be connected into a larger ring using their ring in and ring out connectors.

An MAU is also called a "ring in a box". The loop that used to make up the ring of the token Ring is now integrated into this device. In Token Ring, when a link is broken in the ring, the entire network goes down; however with an MAU, the broken circuit is closed within 1ms; allowing stations on the ring to have their cords unplugged without disabling the entire network.
