= Noel Chiappa =

American computer network researcher

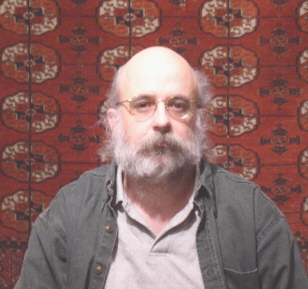
- Born: Joseph Noel Chiappa; 1956 (age 69–70); Bermuda
- Education: MIT
- Scientific career
- Fields: Networking, routing protocols, TCP/IP
- Workplaces: MIT, International Network Working Group, IETF, Proteon

Joseph Noel Chiappa (born 1956) is an American computer scientist, working in computer networks, information systems architecture, and software. He is pioneer of routing protocols, and contributed to the development of the modern internet through contributitions to the Internet protocol suite, for which he was named on the "Birth of the Internet" plaque at the entrance to the Gates Computer Science Building at Stanford University.

== Early life and education ==
Chiappa was born in 1956 in Bermuda, attending Saltus Grammar School in Pembroke Parish. He attended secondary school and university in Massachusets, the former at Phillips Academy in Andover and in 1974 enrolled at the Massachusets Institute of Technology in Cambridge.

Chiappa's undergraduate tenure at MIT coincided with a reorganization and expansion of networking research of the university's DARPA-funded computer science research group (at the time known as "Project MAC") under newly appointed director Michael L. Dertouzos. In 1975, DARPA directed the group to change its research framework to token ring networking in collaboration with the protocol's developers, David J. Faber's group at the University of California, Irvine. This technology used PDP-11 interfaces, for which the group lacked an experienced programmer. Chiappa approached Project MAC with interest in their operating systems (OS) group, which was being deprioritized as a research focus in favor of networking. Experienced with PDP-11 programming, Chiappa was brought on to write diagnostics software for the PDP-11 LAN in exchange for support to perform OS research, but instead changed his focus to networking.

== Career ==
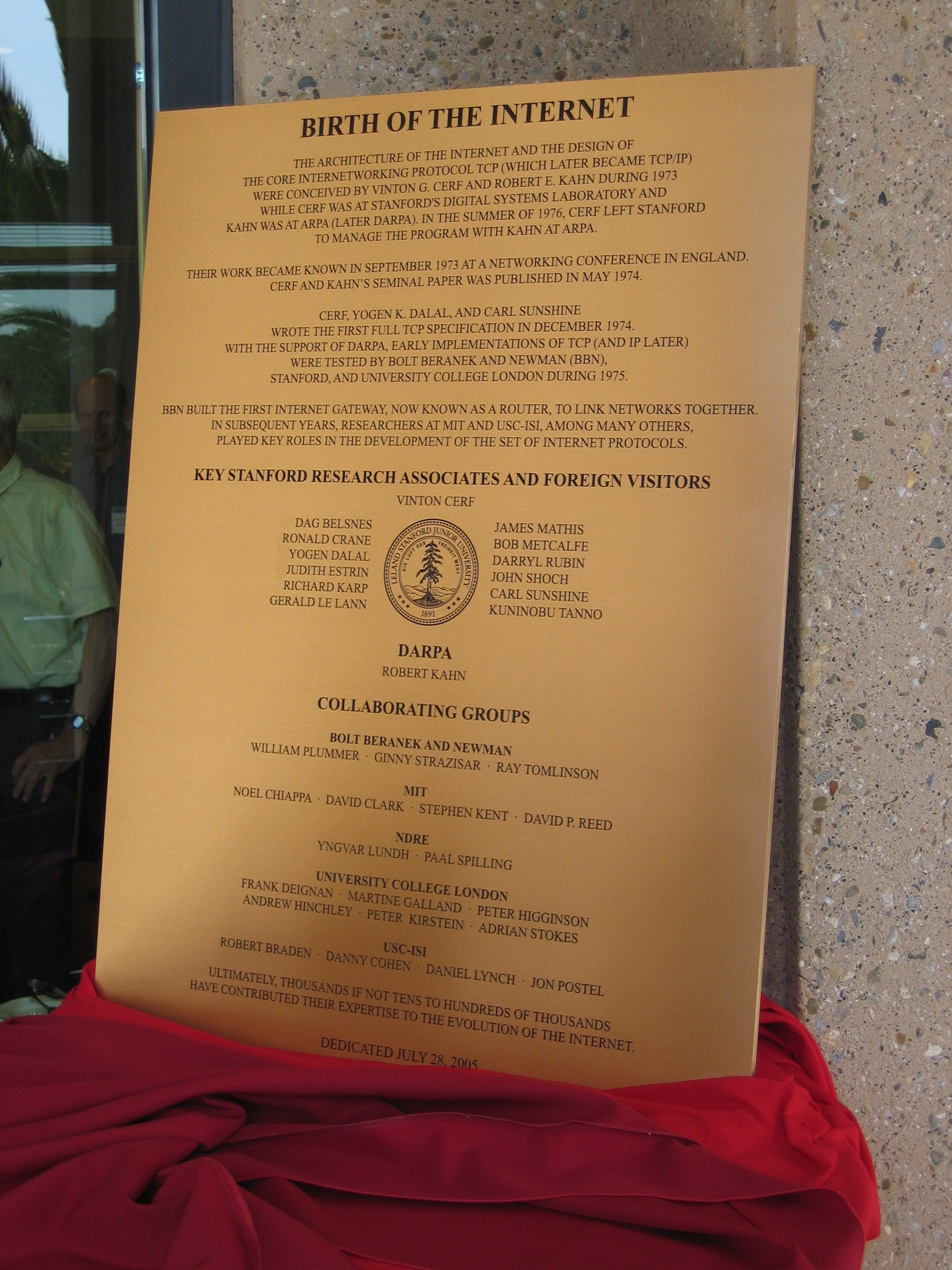
Unveiling of the "Birth of the Internet" plaque at Stanford University in 2005. Chiappa's name is visible alongside the three other contributors from MIT.

In 1980, Chiappa started work on MIT's Chaosnet router, at the time the dedicated two-way network gateway into ARPANET, a major predecessor to the modern internet. This code routed Chaosnet and IP packets independently, and was later licensed to Proteon and formed the codebase of the first commercially available multiprotocol router, the Proteon p4200. The following year, Chiappa published the original version of Trivial File Transfer Protocol (TFTP).

In addition to being present on the "Birth of the Internet" plaque, Chiappa is acknowledged and authored numerous RFC's important in the history of modern networking such as RFC-826, RFC-919, and RFC-950. He has worked extensively on the Locator/Identifier Separation Protocol (LISP). In 1992, Chiappa was also credited for fixing the "Sorcerer's Apprentice" protocol bug as well as other document problems. He served as the first Internet Area Director on the Internet Engineering Steering Group, from 1989 to 1992.

From 2012, Chiappa worked on long-term issues in both the Internet Research Task Force and Internet Engineering Task Force and its predecessors, serving as the first Area Director for Internet Services of the Internet Engineering Steering Group from 1987 to 1992.

== Personal life ==
Chiappa lives in Yorktown, Virginia with his family. He is an expert curator and collector of Asian fine art, particularly Japanese woodblock prints, about which he has produced documentation and glossaries. In 2003 and 2007, he exhibited his personal collections at the Bermuda National Gallery in Hamilton, Bermuda.
