= CAT4 =

CAT4 or Cat 4 may refer to:

- Cognitive Abilities Test (CAT4) used to predict student success by assessing verbal, non-verbal, mathematical, and spatial reasoning.
- Category 4 cable, network cabling that consists of four unshielded twisted-pair wires
- Qualicum Beach Airport (TC LID code), an airport in British Columbia, Canada
- Category 4 hurricane
- LTE User Equipment Category 4 in mobile communications standards
