= Switched communication network =

Switched connections are used for two non-adjacent nodes

In computer networking and telecommunications, a switched communication network is a communication network which transfers data packets from one device (nodes) to another across a network.

Switched communication networks are divided into circuit switched networks, message switched networks, and packet switched networks.

== See also ==
- Broadcast communication network
- Fully connected network
