= Broadcast communication network =

In computer networking and telecommunications, a broadcast communication network is a communication network which uses broadcasting for communication between its nodes. They take messages from a single sender and transmit to all endpoints on the network. An example is satellite transmissions, where a receiver station gets data from the satellite but cannot send anything back.

== See also ==
- Fully connected network
- Multicast
- Switched communication network
