= Proteon =

Westborough, MA, US based computer network equipment vendor (1972-1998)

Proteon, Inc.
- Company type: Public
- Traded as: Nasdaq: PTON
- Industry: Networking equipment
- Founded: 1972
- Defunct: 1998
- Fate: Relaunched as OpenROUTE Networks
- Successor: Netrix, NX Networks, NSGDatacom
- Headquarters: Westborough, Massachusetts, Massachusetts, US
- Key people: Howard Salwen, Founder

Proteon, Inc. was a pioneering designer and manufacturer of computer network equipment based in Westborough, Massachusetts. Proteon created the first commercial Token Ring products and created the first commercially available multiprotocol Internet router as well as the OSPF routing protocol.

== History ==
Proteon designed and manufactured of some of the earliest commercial local area network and TCP/IP Internet Router products. Although founded in 1972 by Howard Salwen as communications consulting firm, Proteon became a manufacturer when it produced the first commercial Token Ring network interfaces and media access units in conjunction with MIT. In 1981, it released the 10 Mbit/sec Pronet-10 Token Ring network. and evolved the speeds through 16 MBit/sec, 80 Mbit/sec and 100 Mbit/sec. IBM released a competing Token Ring system in 1984.

In 1986, Proteon released the first commercially available multi-protocol router, the p4200, based on the MIT multi-protocol router, using code developed by Noel Chiappa. Proteon's router products made them one of the key companies producing products to support the growing Internet, among rivals such as Cisco and Wellfleet Communications.

Proteon went public in 1991, issuing 3.1 million shares.

Proteon was renamed and relaunched as OpenROUTE Networks in 1998. OpenRoute Networks merged into Netrix in 1999. The combined company was rebranded as NX Networks, which was acquired by NSGDatacom in 2002, who formed the Netrix product division to support the acquired product line.
