= Source route bridging =

Token Ring routing protocol

Source route bridging is used on Token Ring networks, and is standardized in Section 9 of the IEEE 802.2 standard. The operation of the bridge is simpler (Spanning Tree Protocol is not necessary) and much of the bridging functions are performed by the end systems, particularly the sources, giving rise to its name.

Source-route transparent bridging, abbreviated SRT bridging, is a hybrid of source routing and transparent bridging, standardized in Section 9 of the IEEE 802.2 standard. It allows source routing and transparent bridging to coexist on the same bridged network by using source routing with hosts that support it and transparent bridging otherwise.

The source route bridging algorithm was developed by IBM and was proposed to the IEEE 802.5 committee as the means to bridge between all the LANs.

== Description ==
A field in the Token Ring header, the routing information field (RIF), is used to support source-route bridging. Upon sending a packet, a host attaches a RIF to the packet indicating the series of bridges and network segments to be used for delivering the packet to its destination. The bridges merely follow the list given in the RIF - if a given bridge is next in the list, it forwards the packet, otherwise it ignores it.

When a host wishes to send a packet to a destination for the first time, it needs to determine an appropriate RIF. A special type of broadcast packet is used, which instructs the network bridges to append their bridge number and network segment number to each packet as it is forwarded. Loops are avoided by requiring each bridge to ignore packets that already contain its bridge number in the RIF field. At the destination, these broadcast packets are modified to be standard unicast packets and returned to the source along the reverse path listed in the RIF. Thus, for each route discovery packet broadcast, the source receives back a set of packets, one for each possible path through the network to the destination. It is then up to the source to choose one of these paths (probably the shortest one) for further communications with the destination.

Two frame types are used in order to find the route to the destination network segment. Single-Route (SR) frames make up most of the network traffic and have set destinations, while All-Route (AR) frames are used to find routes. Bridges send AR frames by broadcasting on all network branches; each step of the followed route is registered by the bridge performing it. Each frame has a maximum hop count, which is determined to be greater than the diameter of the network graph, and is decremented by each bridge. to avoid indefinite looping of AR frames, frames are dropped when this hop count reaches zero. The first AR frame that reaches its destination is considered to have followed the best route, and the route can be used for subsequent SR frames; the other AR frames are discarded.

This method of locating a destination network can allow for indirect load balancing among multiple bridges connecting two networks. The more a bridge is loaded, the less likely it is to take part in the route-finding process for a new destination as it will be slow to forward packets. A new AR packet will find a different route over a less busy path if one exists. This method is very different from transparent bridge usage, where redundant bridges will be inactivated; however, more overhead is introduced to find routes, and space is wasted to store them in frames. A switch with a faster backplane can be just as good for performance, if not for fault tolerance. They are primarily found in Token Ring networks.
