= Switched mesh =

A switched mesh is a type of wireless mesh network that uses multiple dedicated radios to communicate between each neighboring node in the mesh via dedicated mesh backhaul links. Nodes in a switched mesh use separate access and backhaul radios.

Each dedicated mesh link is on a separate channel, ensuring that forwarded traffic does not use any bandwidth from any other link in the mesh. At each mesh point, traffic is "switched" from one channel to the next, giving rise to the name. As a result, a switched mesh is capable of much higher capacities and transmission rates than a shared mesh and grows in capacity as nodes are added to the mesh. All of the available bandwidth of each separate radio channel is dedicated to the link to the neighboring node, meaning that total available bandwidth is the sum of the bandwidth of each of the links.

== Context in wireless mesh networking ==
Switched mesh is one of three distinct types of configuration of wireless mesh networking products in the market today:

- single radio shared mesh – in the first type one radio provides both backhaul (packet relaying) and client services (access to a laptop).
- dual radio shared mesh – in the second type one radio relays packets over multiple hops while another provides client access. This significantly improves backhaul bandwidth and latency.
- switched mesh – the third type uses two or more radios for the backhaul for higher bandwidth and low latency. Third generation wireless mesh networking products are replacing previous generation products as more demanding applications like voice and video need to be relayed over many hops in the mesh network.

== See also ==
- Shared mesh
- Mesh networking
- IEEE 802.11
- 802.16
- Wireless LAN
- Wi-Fi
