= Category 4 cable =

Twisted pair cable for networks

Category 4 cable (Cat 4) is a cable that consists of eight copper wires arranged in four unshielded twisted pairs (UTP) supporting signals up to 20 MHz. It is used in telephone networks which can transmit voice and data up to 16 Mbit/s.

For a brief period it was used for some Token Ring, 10BASE-T, and 100BASE-T4 networks, but was quickly superseded by Category 5 cable. It is no longer common or used in new installations and is not recognized by the current version of the ANSI/TIA-568 data cabling standards.
