= Elizabeth Ruth (pilot) =

American pilot

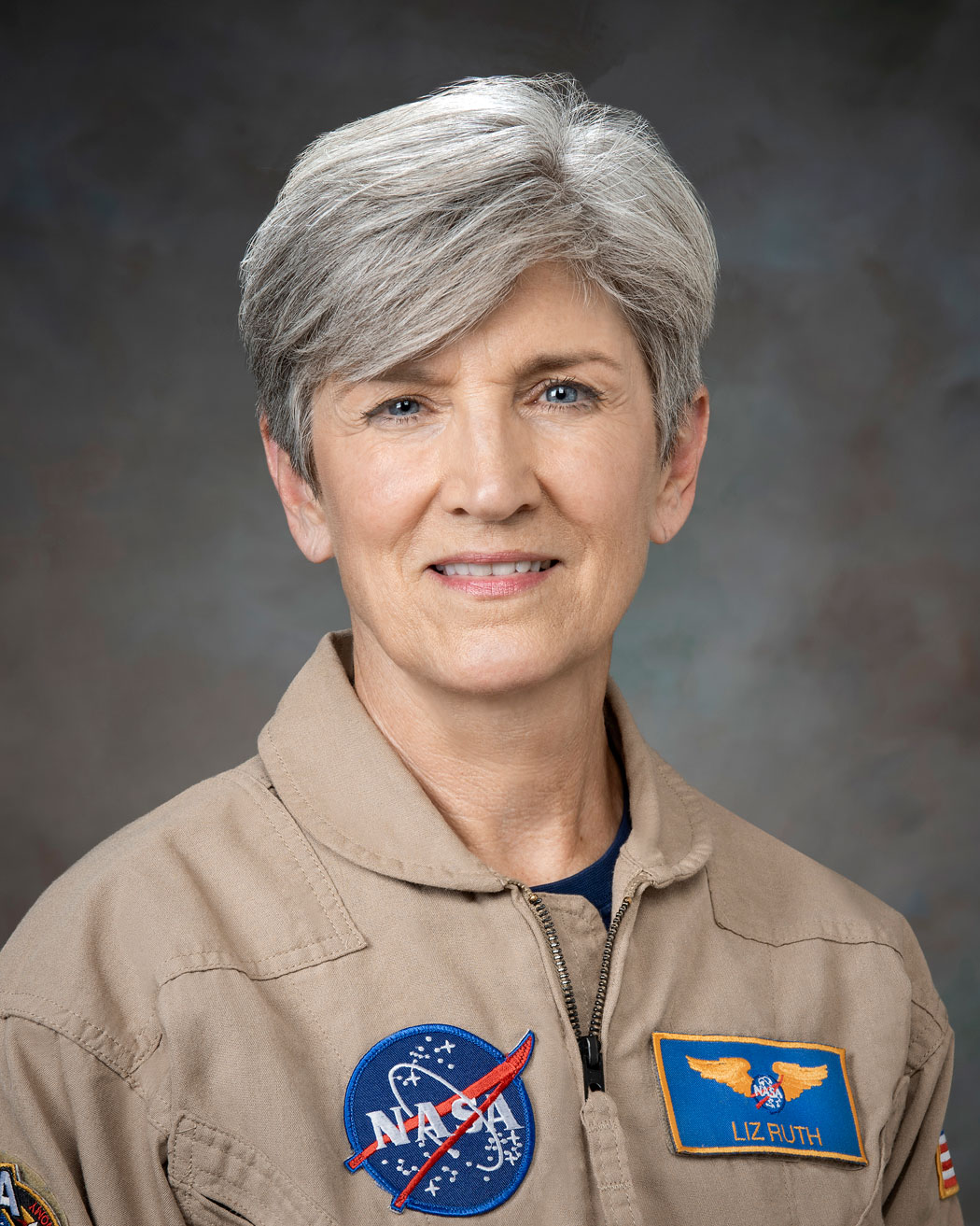
- "Liz" Ruth official photo at Armstrong Flight Research Center, 2018
- Education: Embry–Riddle Aeronautical University; University of Southern California
- Known for: Pilot for the Stratospheric Observatory for Infrared Astronomy

Elizabeth (Liz) Ruth is an American pilot who is the only woman to fly the Stratospheric Observatory for Infrared Astronomy. She works at Armstrong Flight Research Center. She has flown for the United States Air Force, flying Boeing T-43 and Northrop T-38 Talon.

== Early life and education ==
Ruth grew up in a military family. She grew up on a naval base in the Mojave Desert. She was inspired to become a pilot because of her childhood doctor, who flew to see their patients on the naval base. Ruth joined the Air Force Reserve Officer Training Corps and was selected to join the pilot program. She completed a degree in business administration at University of Southern California. She eventually obtained a Master's degree from Embry–Riddle Aeronautical University.

== Career ==
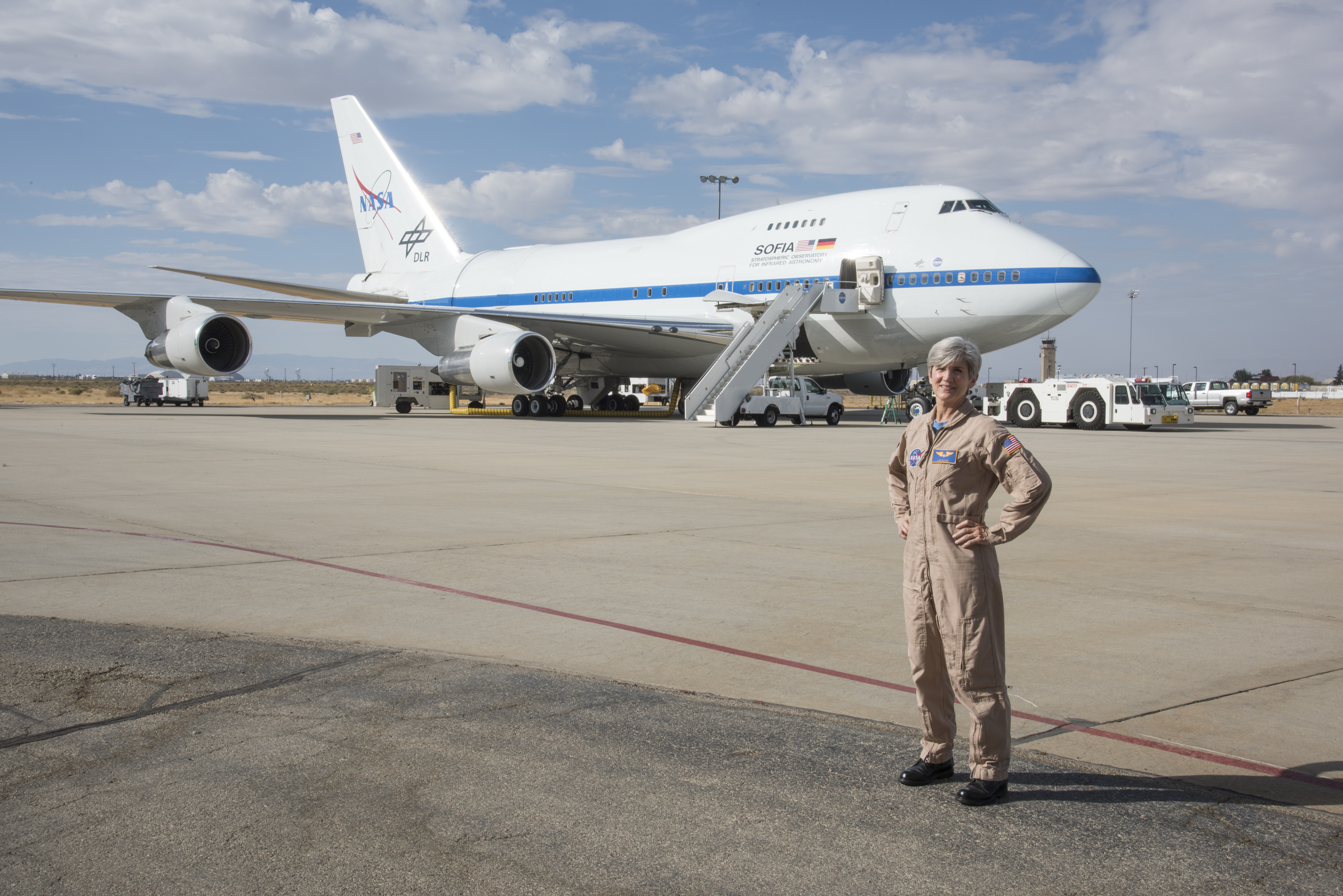
Ruth stands in front of the Stratospheric Observatory for Infrared Astronomy (SOFIA) aircraft.

After earning her commission, Ruth flew the Northrop T-38 Talon and Boeing T-43. She worked for United Airlines as a flight officer and led their training programs. She flew the Boeing 737, Boeing 757, Boeing 767, Boeing 777. She joined Stratospheric Observatory for Infrared Astronomy (SOFIA) in 2016, where she is the only woman pilot. She flies at altitudes up to 14 km, above 99% water vapour. SOFIA is the largest flying observatory in the world. Ruth is a member of the San Luis Obispo 99s. She is a member of the San Luis Obispo Leadership Class.
