= Airborne observatory =

Telescopes carried by aircraft

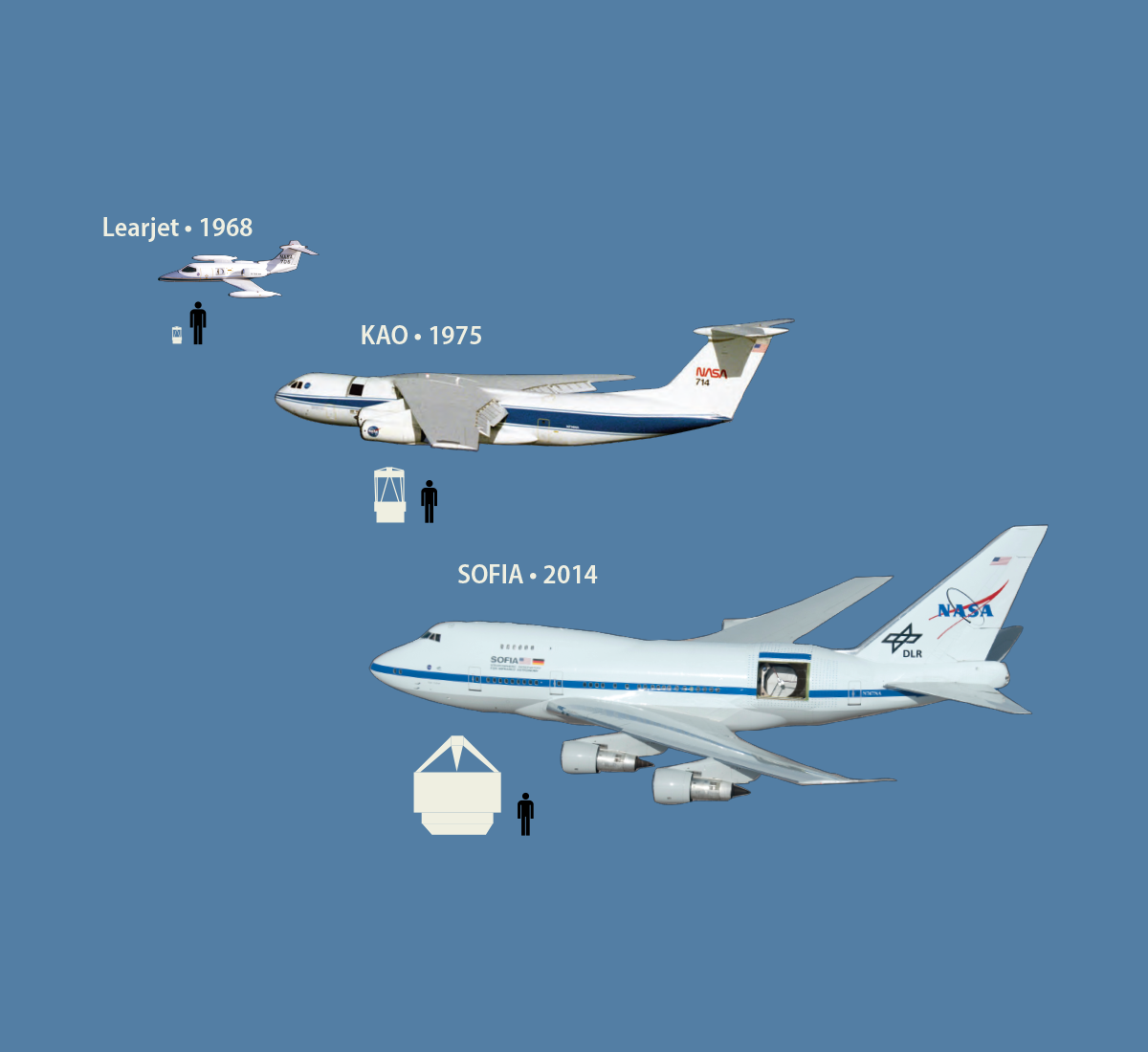
NASA's airborne infrared observatories — the Learjet Observatory, the Kuiper Airborne Observatory and SOFIA — pictured next to illustrations showing how the size of each telescope approximately compares to an adult.

An airborne observatory is an airplane or airship with an astronomical telescope. By carrying the telescope to a sufficiently high altitude, the telescope can avoid cloud cover, pollution, and carry out observations in the infrared spectrum, above water vapor in the atmosphere which absorbs infrared radiation. Some drawbacks to this approach are the instability of the lifting platform, the weight restrictions on the instrument, the need to safely recover the gear afterward, and the cost compared to a comparable ground-based observatory.

Multiple observations of solar eclipses were performed from 1920 to 1980. NASA created first specialised airborne observatory, Galileo, in 1965. SOFIA, the latest such observatory, was retired in 2022.

== History ==
=== Eclipse chasing ===
==== Early attempts ====
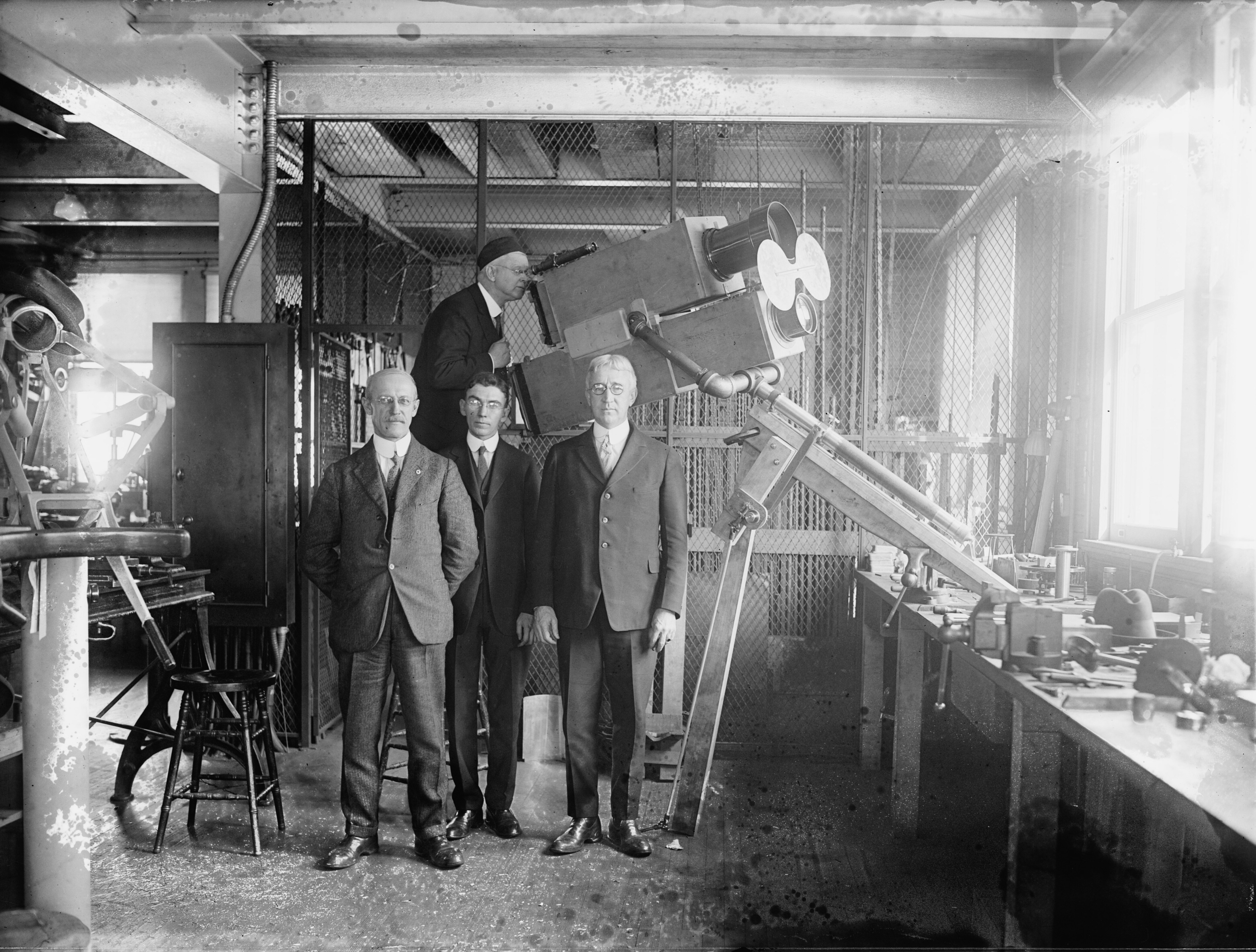
Scientists of Naval Observation with special camera to photograph eclipse from the USS Los Angeles dirigible.

First attempts to observe astronomical objects from planes were made in 1920 from a biplanes. Until 1960, the main objects of such observations were solar eclipses.

In 1923, US Navy tried to observe the solar eclipse of September 10 from sixteen planes, including Felixstowe F5L biplane, "to determine the centerline of the eclipse from air." No photo recorded the eclipse. Officer and photographer Albert William Stevens was one of the pilots on this expedition, he is sometimes called "the father of airborne astronomy". There was another attempt to observe a solar eclipse, this time from a dirigible. On 24 January 1925, U.S. Naval Observatory and U.S. Bureau of Standards gathered a group of astronomers to observe a total solar eclipse from the USS Los Angeles airship over the city of New York, with Captain Edwin Taylor Pollock as a head of the group. They used "two pairs of telescopic cameras", to capture inner and outer portions of Sun's corona, and a spectrograph. The expedition achieved good publicity, but it was not very successful in its observations - the dirigible was not very stable and the photos were blurred. The next attempt was successful: an expedition of the Naval Observatory to observe the solar eclipse of April 28, 1930 on Honey Lake, California, with Vought 02U-1 plane equipped with a camera, recorded "the approach of the shadow".

Army Air Corps and the National Geographic Society organized another expedition in 1932, to observe the eclipse of August 31. Accompanied by Lieutenant Charles D. McAllister of the Army Air Corps, Stevens took the first photograph of the Moon's shadow projected onto the Earth during a solar eclipse.

Royal Canadian Air Force observed the solar eclipse of July 9, 1945 from four planes: "a Spitfire, a Mitchell, and two Ansons"; three planes used seven standard aerial photography cameras, "adjusted to automatically take exposures". For the solar eclipse of May 8, 1948, National Geographic society organized several ground stations and two backup planes for a case of bad weather. Two B-29s, stationed on the Aleutian Islands, successfully observed and photographed the eclipse.

==== After the war ====
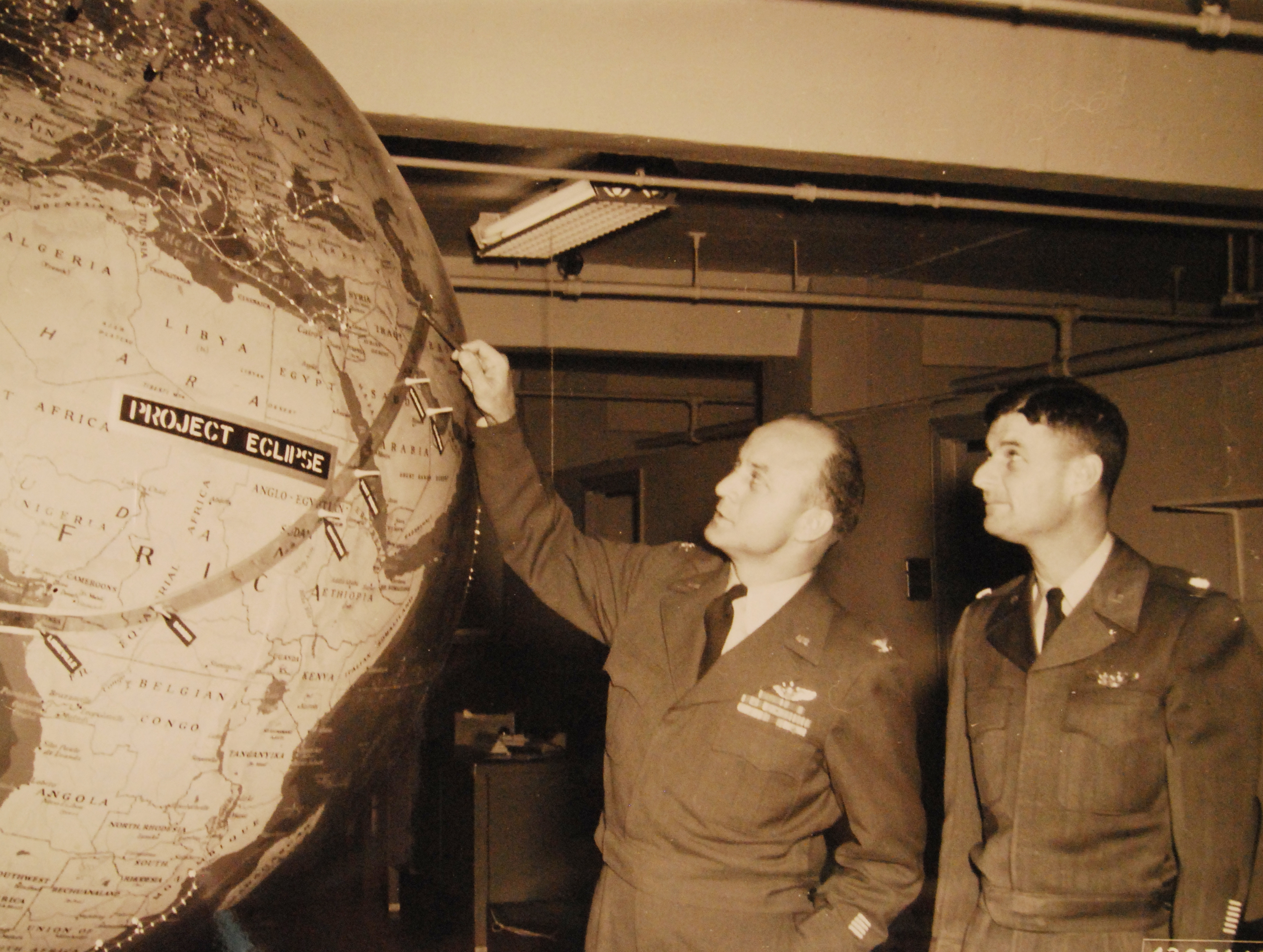
Two United States Air Force colonels inspecting the path of the eclipse of February 25, 1952 in preparation for an expedition to Africa.

For the solar eclipse of June 30, 1954, observations were made "from the open door of a special Lincoln aircraft". Photographs helped "to derive coronal brightness and polarization, along with sky brightness and polarization". Several missions were made in 1960s. Three NC-135 planes of the Los Alamos Scientific Laboratory (LASL) were used for eclipses observations from 1965 to 1980. The planes were operated by the Atomic Energy Commission.

In 1973, the French Concorde prototype, c/n 001, was modified with roof-top portholes for a solar eclipse observation mission of 30 June 1973, at the end of the French testing programme. Observational instruments were installed on board, and the aircraft flew across Africa for 74 minutes in the Moon's shadow. One of the scientists was Donald Liebenberg, who have previously flown on LASL's NC-135. The airplane is now at the Le Bourget Air and Space Museum on permanent display in eclipse livery, with the portholes displayed.

NASA used two retrofitted WB-57F jet planes to chase the total solar eclipse of August 21, 2017. Telescopes were mounted on the noses of the planes, that allowed to capture the clearest images to date of the Sun's corona and the first-ever thermal images of Mercury, revealing how temperature varies across the planet’s surface. The high-definition pictures, captured 30 times per second, will be analyzed for wave motion in the corona to see if waves move towards or away from the surface of the Sun, and with what strengths and sizes.

=== NASA observatories ===
First NASA airborne observatory, Galileo, was a modified Convair 990. It first flew for the solar eclipse of May 30, 1965. It was named Galileo because during the eclipse Guglielmo Righini spotted the moons of Jupiter from the plane. Galileo was used until 1973, when it was destroyed in a mid-air collision. It was used to observe eclipses, Comet Ikeya–Seki, planetary IR observations, and Giacobinid meteor showers. Planetary scientist Gerard P. Kuiper performed a series of Venus observations in near infrared and Mars opposition. Galileo II, also a Convair 990, was used for a very short time.

To avoid atmospheric absorption of infrared radiation, Frank J. Low developed devices that could be placed aboard aircraft, first using a Douglas A-3 Skywarrior from the United States Navy that carried a 2-inch telescope in 1965 and 1966. The Learjet Observatory with an open-port 12-inch telescope was proposed in 1966 by Low, and made its first flight in 1968. It allowed to perform infrared astronomy; among other discoveries are "the first measurement of the internal energies of Jupiter and Saturn, far-infrared observations of the great nebula in Orion, studies of star formation regions and the bright IR sources at the center of the Milky Way galaxy", and also to determine the nature of Venus' clouds using a spectrosopy.

The Kuiper Airborne Observatory (KAO), first flown in 1974, consisted of a 36 in (91 cm) aperture Cassegrain reflector carried aloft on a Lockheed C-141 Starlifter jet transport to perform infrared observations. It was named after Gerard P. Kuiper. KAO was operational from 1974 to 1995, and usually flew about 70 flights per year. Among its discoveries are:

discovery of the rings around the planet Uranus; detection of water vapor in comets; discovery of Pluto's atmosphere; the composition, structure, and dynamics of Supernova 1987a; luminosity, dust, and gas distributions in the Galactic Center; emission by shocked gas components of the interstellar medium; and the structure of star-forming clouds.

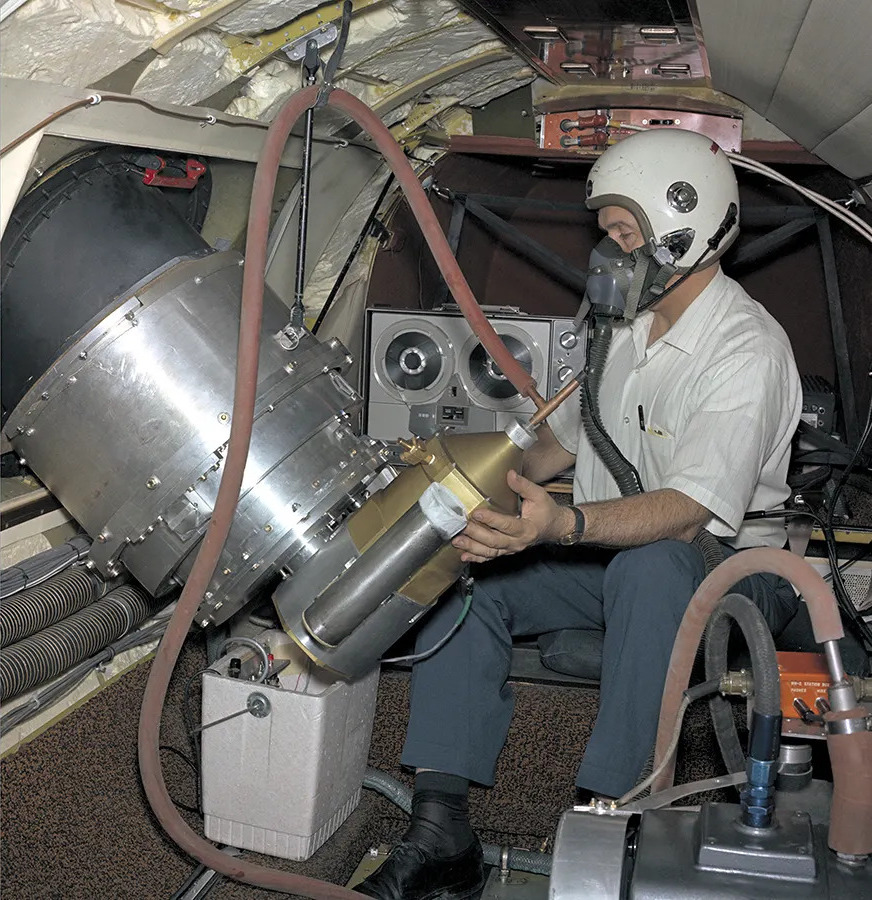
12-inch infrared telescope of the Learjet Observatory

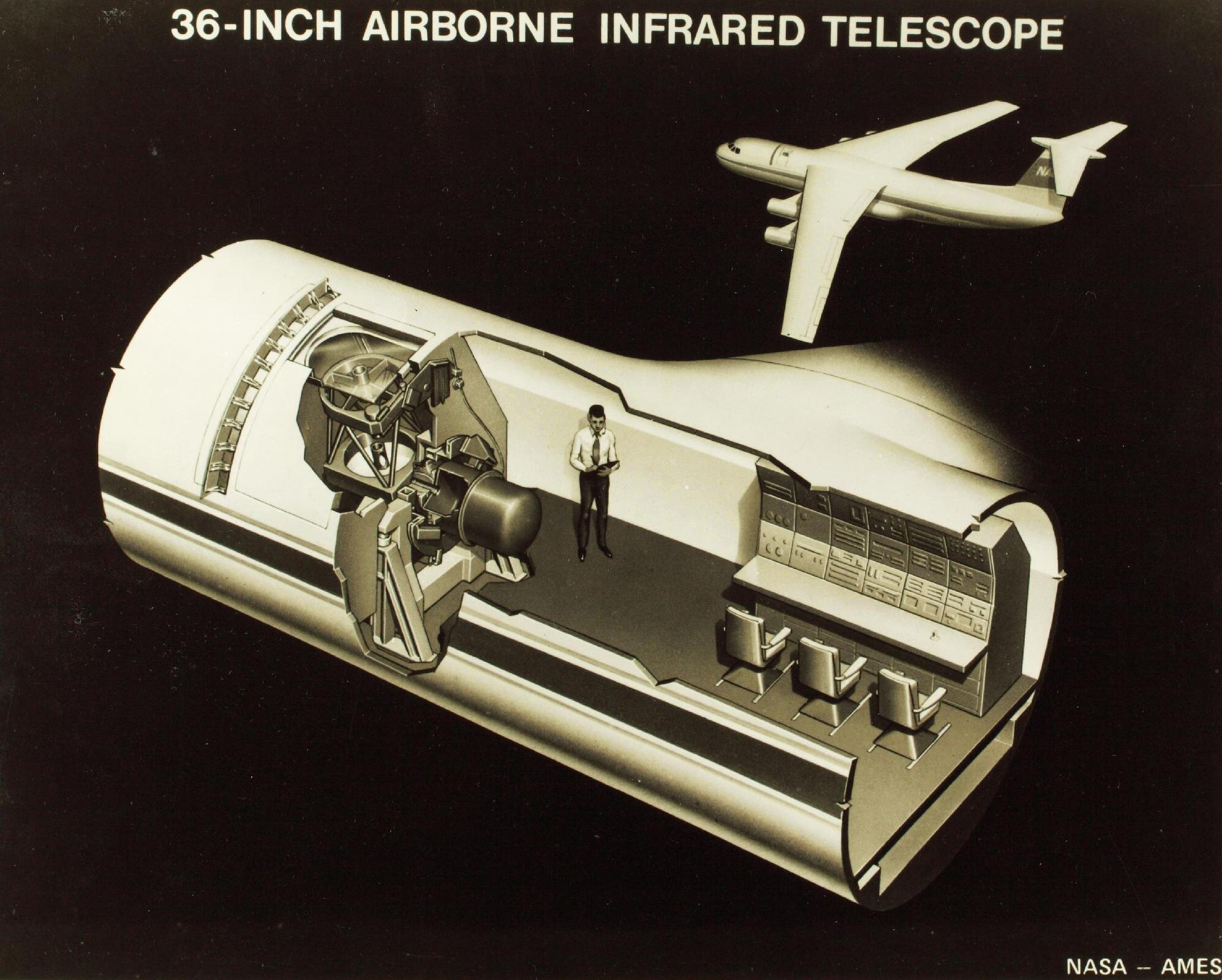
Kuiper Airborne Observatory interior

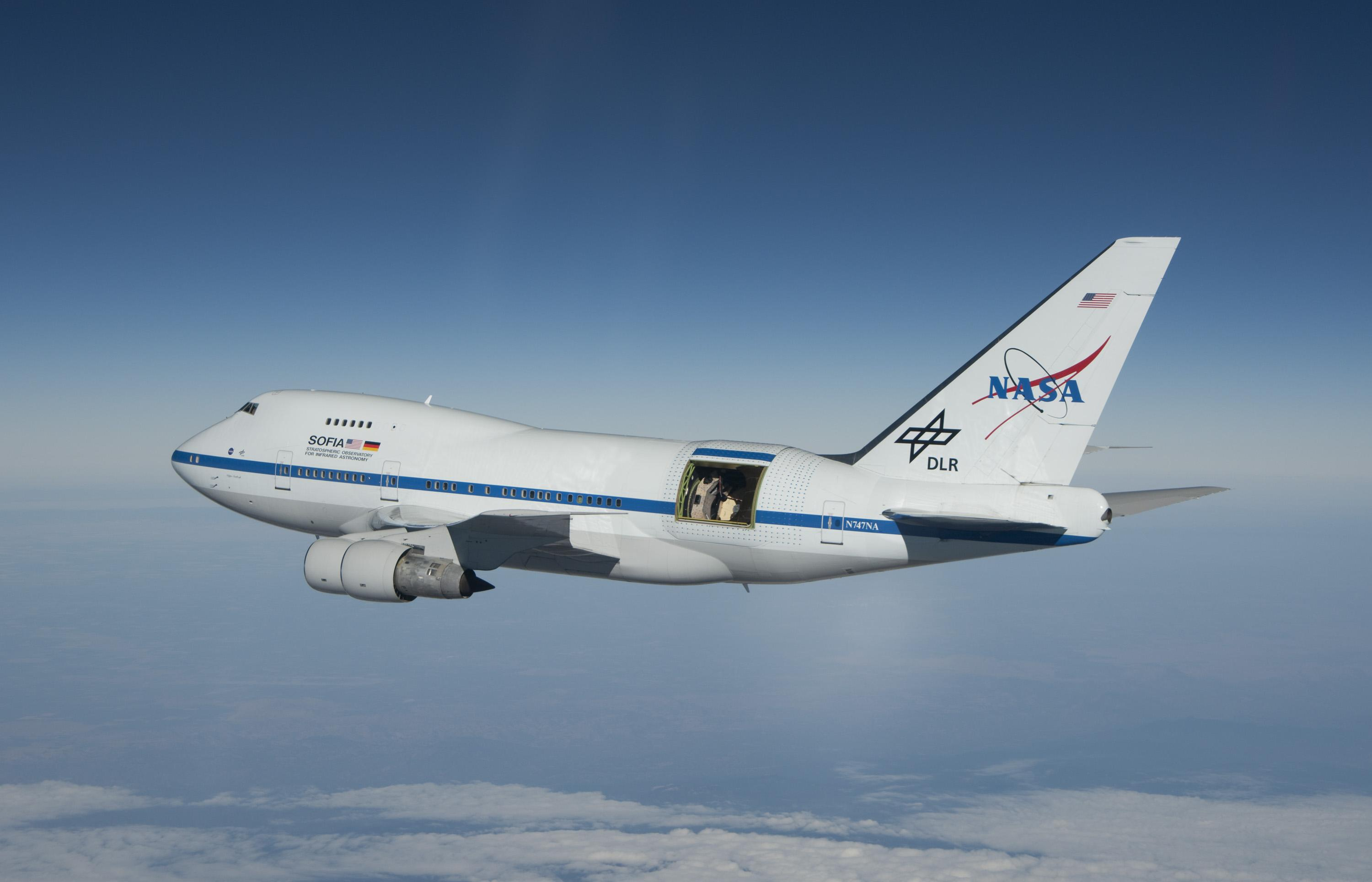
Stratospheric Observatory for Infrared Astronomy (SOFIA)

In terms of aperture, the largest aircraft-borne instrument to date is a 2.7 m (110 in) reflector telescope carried by a modified Boeing 747 for the Stratospheric Observatory for Infrared Astronomy (SOFIA) project. This instrument was put into use for astronomical observation in 2010. On 29 June 2015, the dwarf planet Pluto passed between a distant star and the Earth producing a shadow on the Earth near New Zealand that allowed SOFIA to study the atmosphere of Pluto.

== Features ==
Overview of wavelengths observable at different altitudes with an airborne observatory depicted.

By carrying the telescope to a sufficiently high altitude, the telescope can avoid cloud cover, pollution, and carry out observations in the infrared spectrum, above water vapor in the atmosphere which absorbs infrared radiation. Using an airplane also allows placing the telescope exactly in the required position. Some drawbacks to this approach are the instability of the lifting platform, the weight restrictions on the instrument, the need to safely recover the gear afterward, and the cost compared to a comparable ground-based observatory.

Airborne observatories are very expensive to operate, because they require a crew, a pilot, and fuel. The yearly cost of running the SOFIA observatory was nearly the same as of the Hubble Space Telescope.

== List of specially-built airborne observatories ==
Observatory	Photo	Aircraft	Tail#	Telescope	In-service	Out-of-service	Notes	Refs
NASA Galileo Airborne Observatory		Convair 990	N711NA		1965	1973	Destroyed in a mid-air collision.	
NASA Learjet Observatory		Learjet 24B	N705NA	31 cm	1966	1974 (Note: last flight)		
NASA Kuiper Airborne Observatory (KAO)		Lockheed C-141A Starlifter	N714NA	91 cm	1974	1995	Replaced both Galileo and Learjet, replaced by SOFIA.	
NASA-DLR Stratospheric Observatory for Infrared Astronomy (SOFIA)		Boeing 747SP	N747NA	2.7 m	2010	2022	Replaced KAO.	

== See also ==
- Balloon-borne telescope
- Space telescope
- Timeline of telescopes, observatories, and observing technology
