= 1973 Sunnyvale mid-air collision =

1973 mid-air collision over California

Accident
- Date: 12 April 1973
- Summary: Mid-air collision due to ATC error
- Site: 1 km south of Moffet Field, California; 37°24′00″N 122°2′28″W
- Total fatalities: 16
- Total survivors: 1

First aircraft
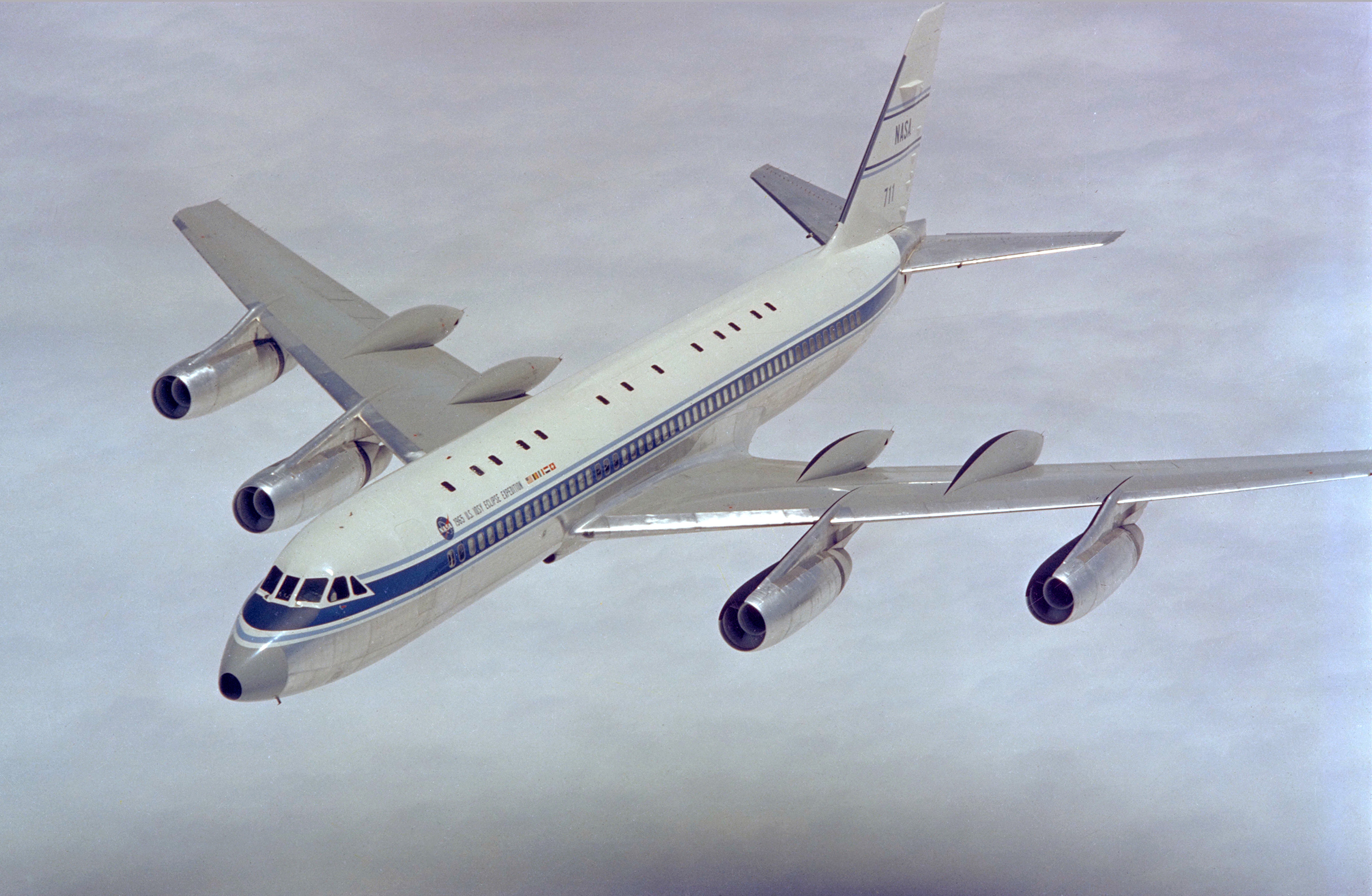
- N711NA, the CV-990 involved, seen in 1965
- Type: Convair CV-990-30A-5 Coronado
- Name: "Galileo"
- Operator: NASA
- Registration: N711NA
- Flight origin: Moffet Field, California
- Destination: Moffet Field, California
- Occupants: 11
- Passengers: 8
- Crew: 3
- Fatalities: 11
- Survivors: 0

Second aircraft
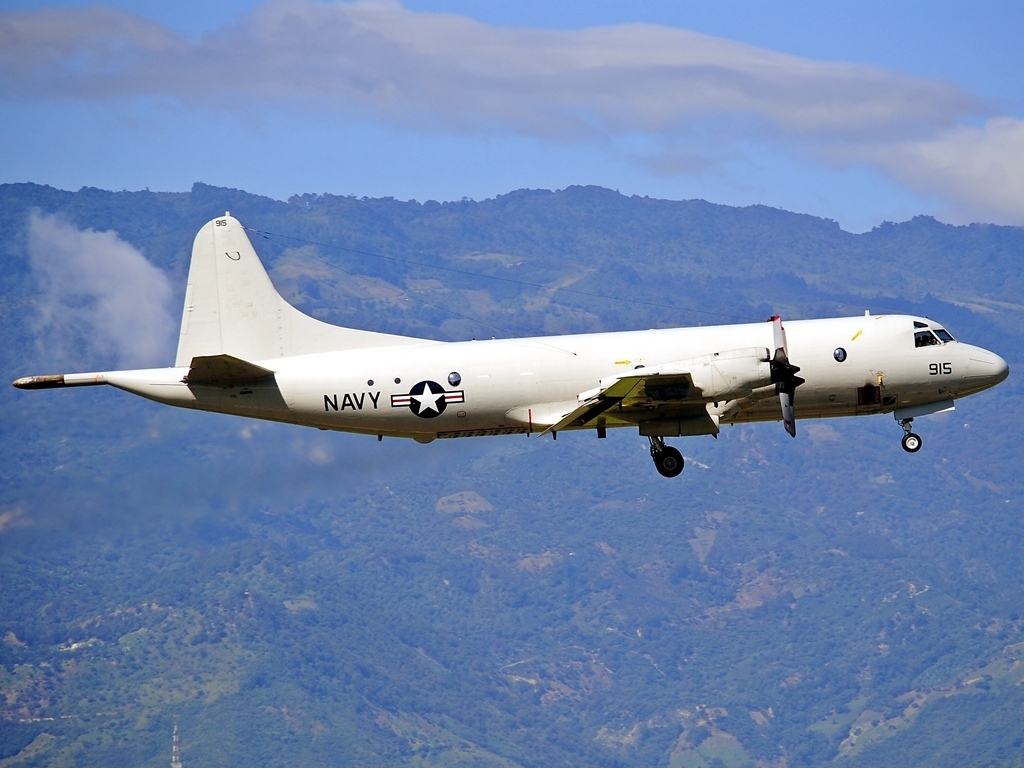
- A US Navy P-3C Orion, similar to the accident aircraft
- Type: Lockheed P-3C Orion
- Operator: United States Navy
- Registration: 157332
- Flight origin: Moffet Field, California
- Destination: Moffet Field, California
- Occupants: 6
- Crew: 6
- Fatalities: 5
- Survivors: 1

On April 12, 1973, a NASA Convair CV-990 and a US Navy Lockheed P-3 Orion collided on approach to Moffet Field, California. The two aircraft crashed on a golf course, killing all 11 on the CV-990 and 5 of the 6 on board the Orion.

== Aircraft ==
One of the aircraft involved was 157332, a Lockheed P-3C Orion operated by the US Navy built in 1970. It was assigned to Patrol Squadron 47.

The other was N711NA, a Convair CV-990-30A-5 Coronado operated by NASA. The aircraft was built in 1961 and was modified into a flying observatory. The modifications included optically refined windows in the upper fuselage. The aircraft was nicknamed "Galileo".

== Accident ==
The Orion departed for a training flight five and a half hours prior to the accident. The plane was flying over the ocean off Big Sur and then returned to Moffet Field to perform touch-and-go landings on runway 32L, which it continued to do for the next hour and a half. The CV-990 was returning from a two-hour flight over Monterey Bay where it was testing a system for surveying sea mammals.

The weather at the airport was good, with great visibility. At 14:46 local time, the CV-990 was cleared for approach to runway 32R. Three minutes later, the CV-990 was cleared to approach runway 32L, the runway the Orion was performing touch-and-go landings on. The pilot of the CV-990 replied "32L, thank you", and the pilot of the P-3 stated "...touch-and-go left side." The CV-990 was descending directly above the P-3, when, according to eyewitnesses, the P-3 initiated a climb. The CV-990 struck the P-3's upper aft fuselage at an altitude of 300 feet and the aircraft crashed entangled on the Sunnyvale Municipal Golf Course a kilometer short of the runway. All 11 on board the CV-990 and 5 of the 6 on board the P-3 died in the crash and ensuing fire.

== Cause ==
The collision was a result of mistakes on part of the approach controller. The controller cleared the CV-990 for approach to a runway that the P-3 was already approaching. The crew of the CV-990 did not question this runway change.
