= Frank J. Low =

American astronomer and physicist

- Born: Frank James Low; December 23, 1933; Mobile, Alabama, U.S.
- Died: June 11, 2009 (aged 75); Tucson, Arizona, U.S.
- Education: Yale University (BS); Rice University (PhD)
- Known for: Infrared Astronomy
- Scientific career
- Fields: Physics and astronomy
- Thesis: Adiabatic fast passage measurements of the nuclear magnetism in liquid helium (1959)
- Doctoral advisor: Harold E. Rorschach Jr.
- Website: infraredlaboratories.com

Frank James Low (November 23, 1933 – June 11, 2009) was an American solid state physicist who became a leader in the new field of infrared astronomy, after inventing the gallium doped germanium bolometer in 1961. This detector extended the range of the observable spectrum to much longer wavelengths.

== Early life and education ==
Born on November 23, 1933, in Mobile, Alabama, Low grew up as a child in Houston, Texas. His undergraduate studies in physics were at Yale University and he obtained his Doctor of Philosophy degree in physics from Rice University in 1959.

== Infrared astronomy ==
He started working at Texas Instruments in 1961, where one of his early projects was the development of a low-temperature thermometer that was developed using a germanium semiconductor that had been doped with small quantities of gallium, which measured changes in temperature based on the change in the device's electrical resistance as energy was absorbed. Based on his academic experiences, he came to the conclusion that the technology behind this thermometer could be integrated as the basis for a bolometer that could be used to measure the radiant energy coming from stars as infrared radiation, waves that occupy a portion of the electromagnetic spectrum whose wavelength is longer than for visible light (400–700 nm), but shorter than those of terahertz radiation (100 μm – 1 mm) or microwaves.

Astronomers had been trying to find measures to detect infrared radiation for years, and Low went to the National Radio Astronomy Observatory in Green Bank, West Virginia, in 1962 to test his bolometer, more sensitive to infrared than detectors previously in use on the Green Bank Telescope, the world's largest fully steerable radio telescope. However, infrared waves are absorbed by molecules such as water vapor in the atmosphere.

To avoid atmospheric absorption of infrared radiation, Low developed devices that could be placed aboard aircraft, first using a Douglas A-3 Skywarrior from the United States Navy that carried a 2-inch telescope in 1965 and 1966, and later using a Learjet operated by NASA with a 12-inch telescope on board. Low used the Learjet to make the discovery that both Jupiter and Saturn were emitting more energy than what they receive as solar radiation, demonstrating that both of these planets must have an internal source of energy. Low continued to use the Learjet for research, even after NASA started use of the Kuiper Airborne Observatory in 1975 using a former C-141 Starlifter cargo craft, which is to be replaced with Stratospheric Observatory for Infrared Astronomy (SOFIA), a joint NASA and German Aerospace Center project that uses a converted Boeing 747SP.

He had worked at Rice University and at the University of Arizona. He was also the president of Infrared Laboratories, Inc., which he founded in 1967 to make infrared detectors and cryostats for observatories and infrared microscopes as well.

He proposed and joined the international project to build the Infrared Astronomy Satellite (IRAS), a project that included joint efforts from the United States, United Kingdom and the Netherlands, which made the first survey of the infrared sky from space, avoiding all atmospheric interference with observations, starting in 1983. Low served as the chief technologist for the project. After an accident at Jet Propulsion Laboratory destroyed preamplifiers used in the infrared detectors, Low led an effort at Infrared Laboratories to develop improved replacement units to resolve the crisis. IRAS was able to discover in excess of 500,000 infrared sources, including many galaxies, and has discovered shells of debris surrounding stars that show the early stages of planetary formation, with debris similar to that later found as the Kuiper belt that encircles the Solar System beyond the orbit of Neptune. Based on these findings, researchers have concluded that the majority of galactic radiation is emitted in the form of infrared radiation that is generated when light from young stars is absorbed by interstellar dust and then radiated from the dust in the form of heat. In 1984, IRAS found that the galaxy Arp 220, located 300 million light years from Earth, is the closest Ultraluminous Infrared Galaxy, emitting 100 times more energy than the Milky Way galaxy, primarily in the infrared spectrum, even though it is faintly visible by telescope using visible light.

Low was named to serve as facility scientist for NASA's Space Infrared Telescope Facility, later renamed the Spitzer Space Telescope. The effort had been delayed by cost overruns, until Low had an inspiration at a 1993 retreat for the project's scientists; the passive cooling technique could be used – rather than place the entire telescope in a bath of liquid helium to cool the unit to temperatures near absolute zero, the unit could be exposed to the vacuum of space to radiate most of its heat while the detectors themselves were the only components cooled using liquid helium, a design change that allowed the Spitzer project to go ahead towards its launch in 2003. Timothy Hawarden has been recognized by NASA for the development of the passive cooling technique, which has also been included in other space probes, such as the James Webb Space Telescope, a partial successor to the Hubble Space Telescope, that will search for the oldest objects in the universe.

== Personal ==
Low died at age 75 on June 11, 2009, in Tucson, Arizona, after a long illness. He was survived by his wife, three children and six grandchildren.

== Honors ==
Awards

- Rumford Prize (1986)
- Helen Warner Prize (1968)
- Joseph Weber Award (2003)
- Jansky Lectureship before the National Radio Astronomy Observatory(2006)
- Bruce Medal (2006)

Named after him

- Kleinmann–Low Nebula (with Douglas E. Kleinmann)
- Asteroid 12142 Franklow
