= Kuiper Airborne Observatory =

NASA-operated space observation platform

Coordinates: 37°24′58″N 122°03′17″W

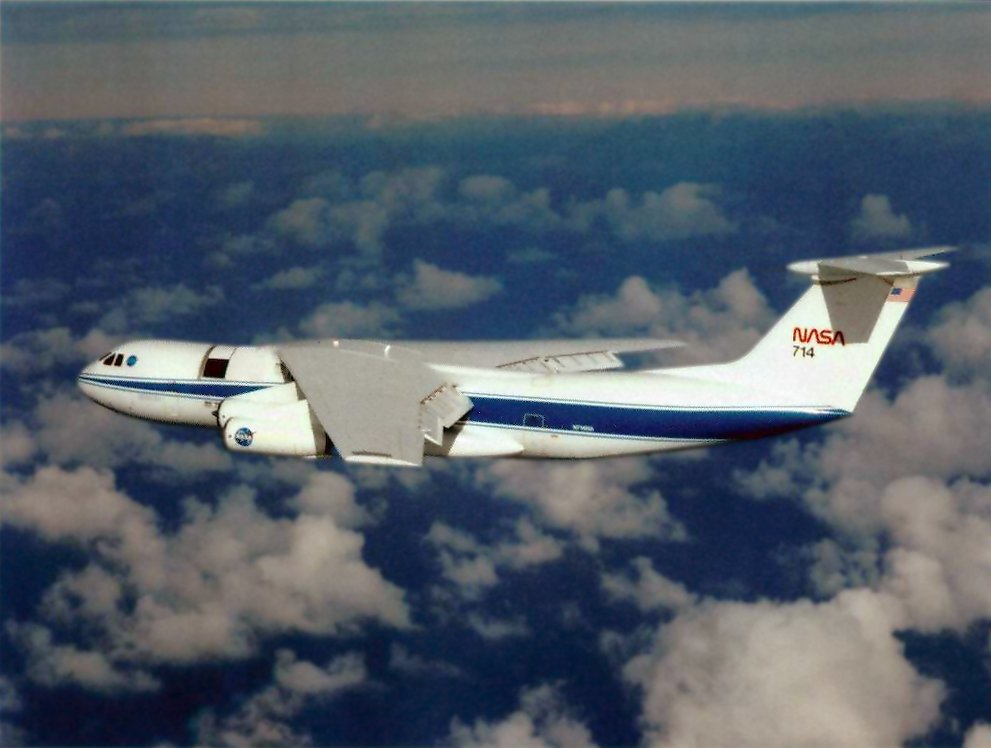
- The KAO in flight

General information
- Other name: Gerard P. Kuiper Airborne Observatory
- Type: Airborne observatory
- Manufacturer: NASA
- Status: Scrapped
- Owners: NASA
- Construction number: 6110
- Registration: N714NA
- Serial: NASA 714

History
- In service: 1974 – 1995
- Developed from: Lockheed C-141 Starlifter
- Preserved at: Moffett Field

The Gerard P. Kuiper Airborne Observatory (KAO) was a national facility operated by NASA to support research in infrared astronomy. The observation platform was a highly modified Lockheed C-141A Starlifter jet transport aircraft (s/n: 6110, registration: N714NA, callsign: NASA 714) with a range of 6,000 nautical miles (11,000 km), capable of conducting research operations at altitudes of up to 48,000 feet (14 km).

== Aircraft ==
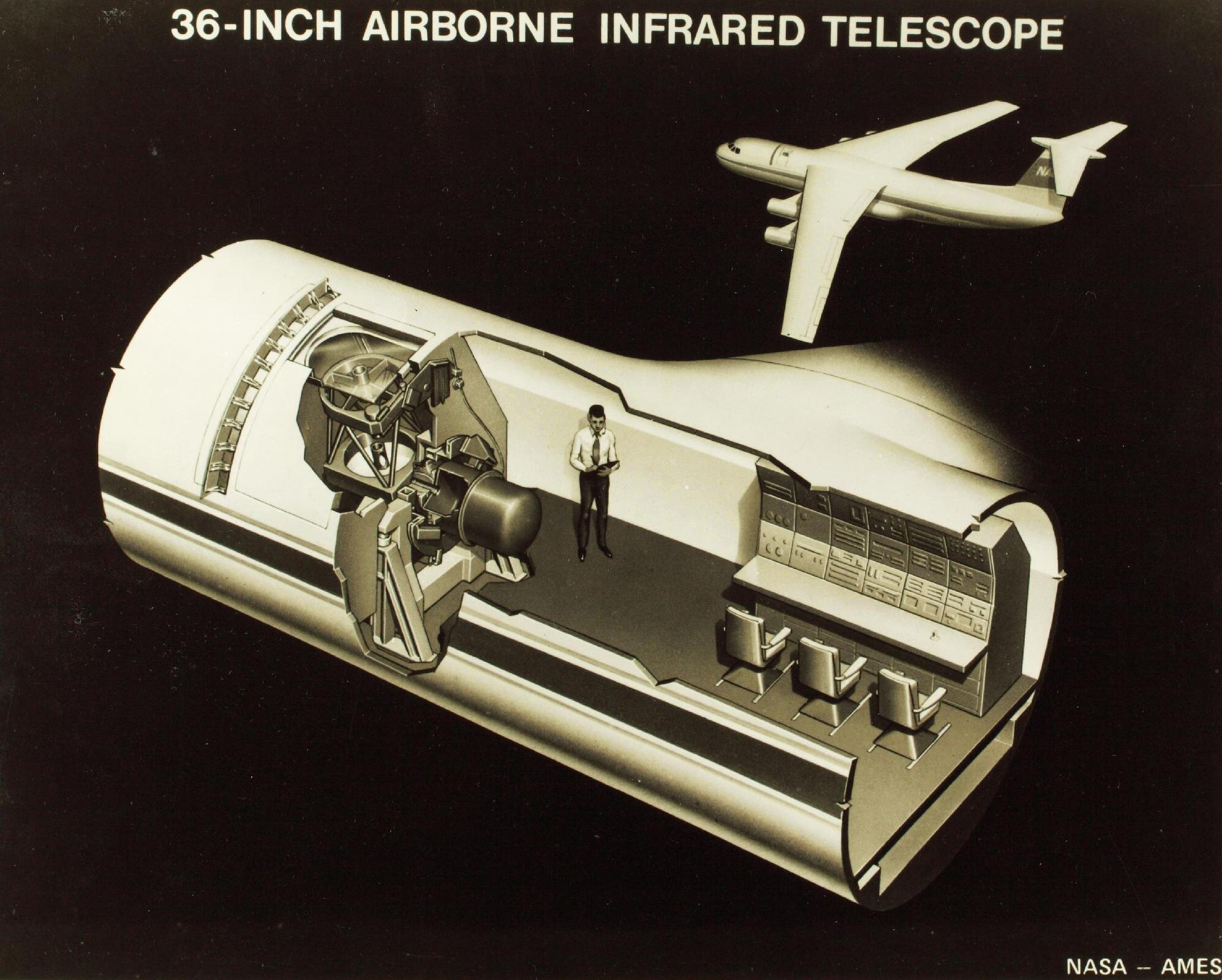
KAO inside

The KAO was based at the Ames Research Center, Moffett Field, near Sunnyvale, California. Prior to its conversion to the airborne observatory, it had served as Lockheed's demonstrator for a potential civilian version of the C-141.

Though it began operation in 1974 as a replacement for an earlier aircraft, the Galileo Observatory (itself a converted Convair 990 (N711NA) that was destroyed in a collision with a U.S. Navy Lockheed P-3C Orion patrol aircraft in 1973), the KAO wasn't dedicated until May 21, 1975. The KAO flew at altitudes of 41,000 to 45,000 feet, and flew a total of 1,417 times.

The KAO has a 160-foot wingspan, measures 145 feet long, and stands 39 feet high. A typical crew consisted of two pilots, a flight engineer, the mission staff, and the flight team, and the aircraft provided a stable platform for missions lasting up to seven and a half hours. The KAO flew mostly out of Moffett Field, but also flew out of New Zealand, Australia, American Samoa, Panama, Japan, Guam, Brazil, Ecuador, Chile, Houston (Texas), and Hawaii.

During a flight in 1978 that took off from American Samoa, two of the observatory's four engines failed soon after takeoff, and after the aircraft staggered and instrument power was shut down, the flight engineer had to crank down the landing gear manually.

== Telescope ==
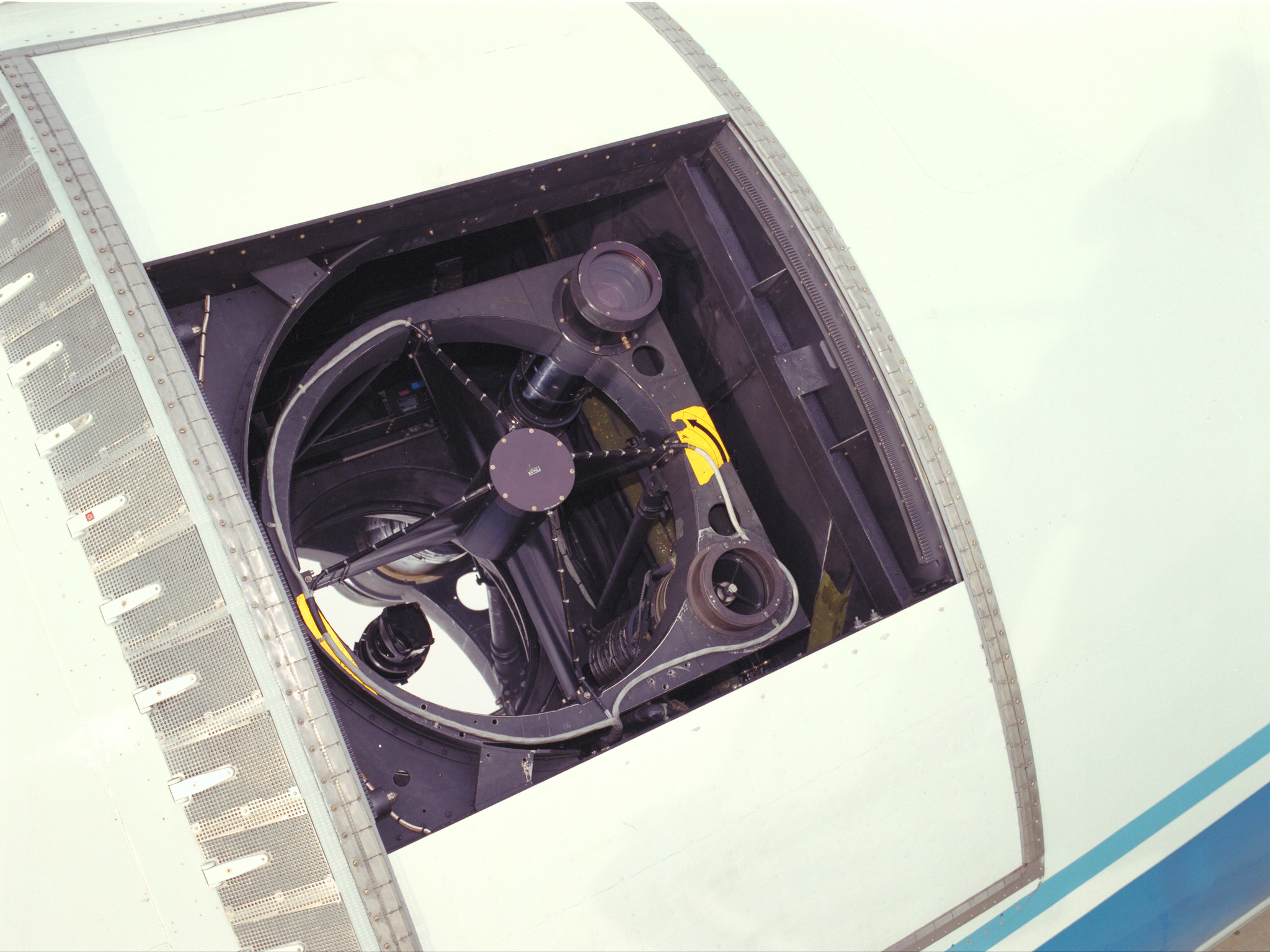
KAO's telescope

The KAO's telescope was a conventional Cassegrain reflector with a 36-inch (91.5 cm) aperture, designed primarily for observations in the 1 to 500 μm spectral range. Its flight capability allowed it to rise above almost all of the water vapor in the Earth's atmosphere (allowing observations of infrared radiation, which is blocked before reaching ground-based facilities), as well as travel to almost any point on the Earth's surface for an observation.

== History ==
The observatory was named in honor of planetary scientist Gerard P. Kuiper, who participated in expeditions on NASA's Galileo Airborne Observatory.

The KAO made several major discoveries, including the first sightings of the rings of Uranus in 1977 and a definitive identification of an atmosphere on Pluto in 1988. The KAO was used to study the origin and distribution of water and organic molecules in regions of star formation, and in the vast spaces between the stars. Kuiper astronomers also studied the disks surrounding certain stars that may be related to the formation of planetary systems around these stars. It took infrared spectrum measurements of the planet Mercury in 1995. No quartz or olivine in Mercury's surface rocks was detected.

Peering still deeper into space, KAO astronomers studied powerful far-infrared emissions from the center of the Milky Way and other galaxies. Scientists on board the KAO tracked the formation of heavy elements like iron, nickel, and cobalt from the massive fusion reactions of supernova SN 1987A.

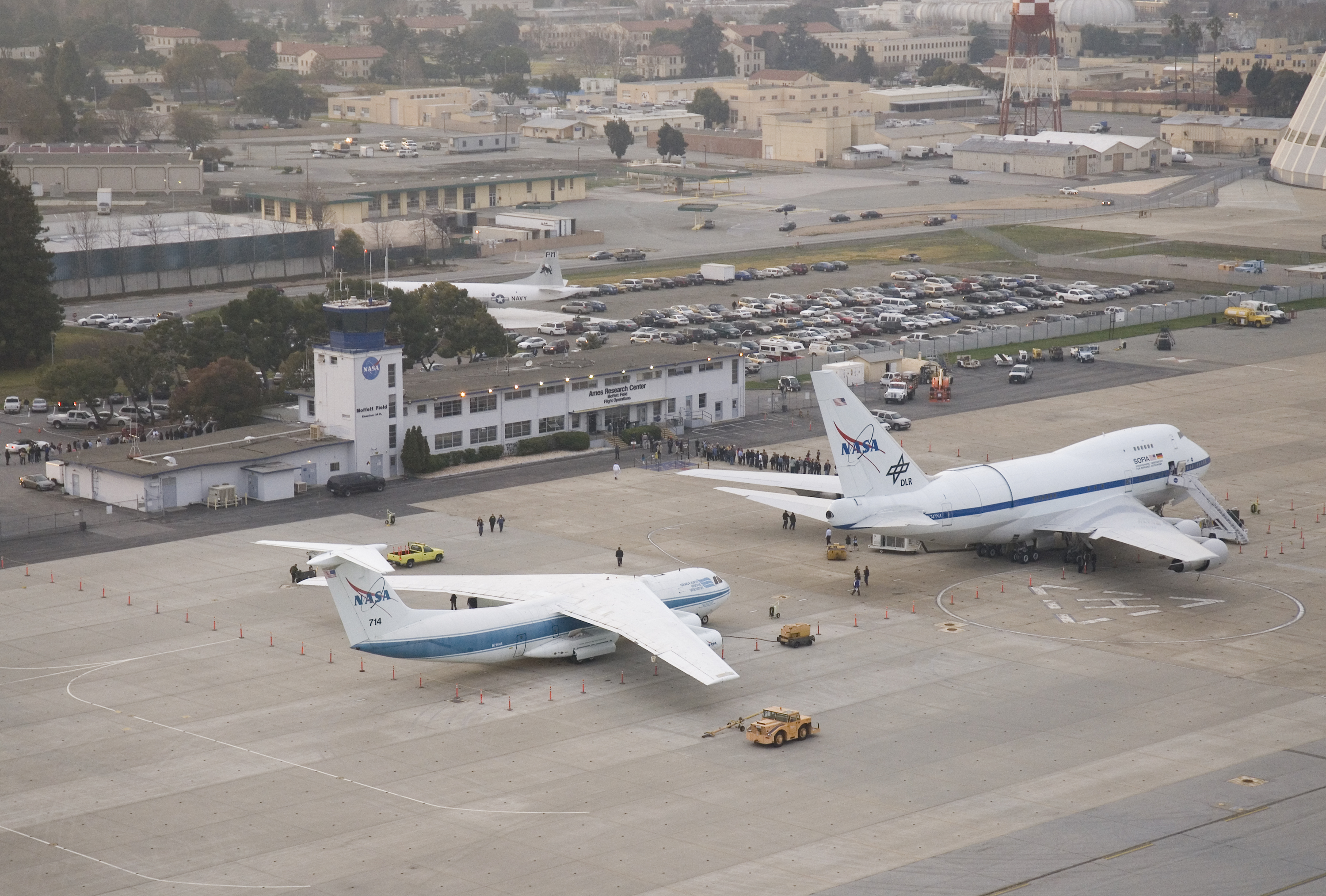
KAO and SOFIA, Ames Research Center 2008

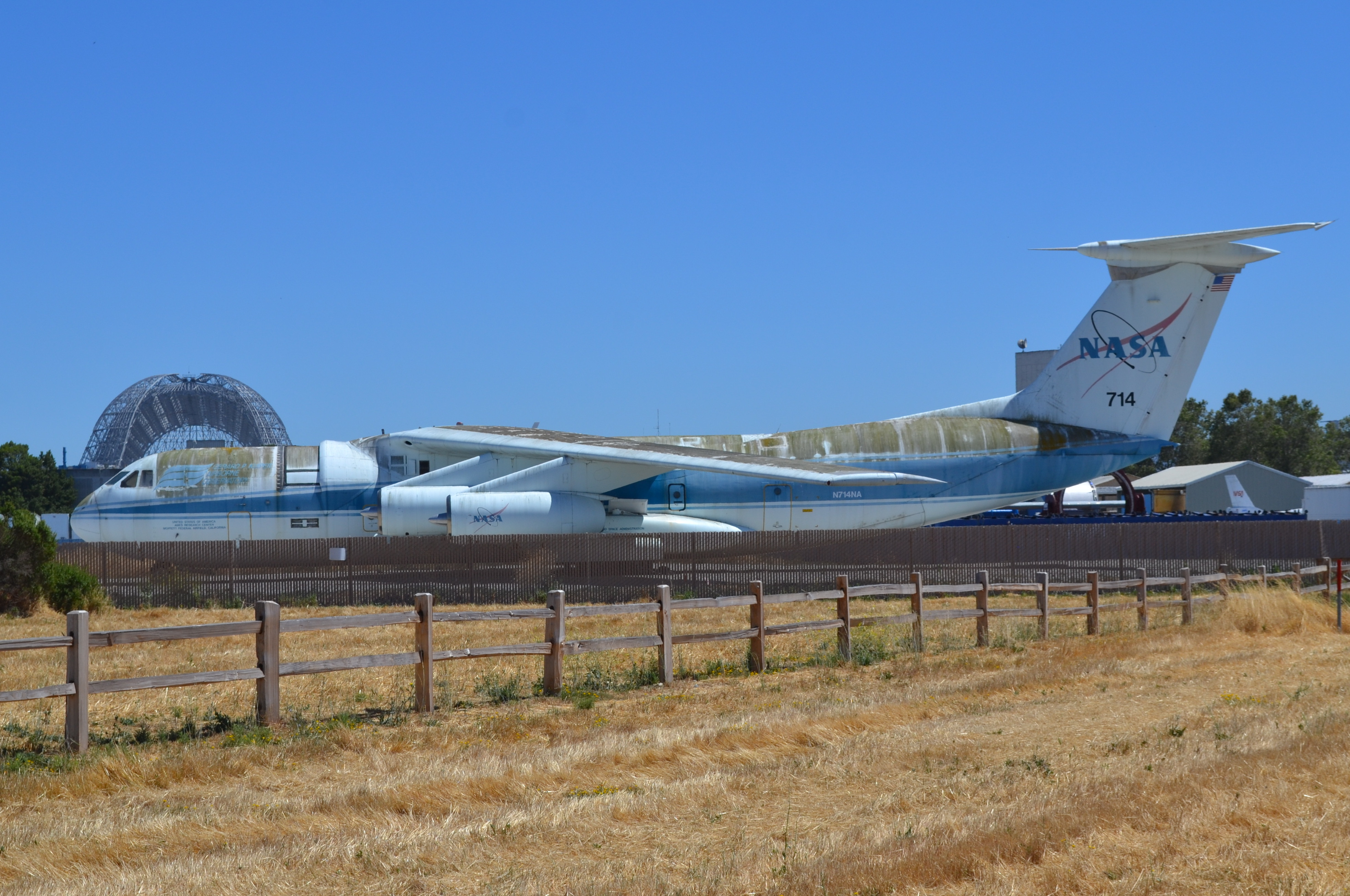
Kuiper Airborne Observatory in 2016

The KAO was retired in 1995 and for many years could be viewed at Moffett Field, although it was no longer airworthy. It has been succeeded by a Boeing 747SP-based airborne observatory equipped with a larger aperture telescope, the Stratospheric Observatory for Infrared Astronomy (SOFIA). SOFIA completed its first test flight on April 26, 2007 and its telescope saw first light on May 26, 2010. Initial "routine" science observation flights began in December 2010 and the observatory was at full capability with about 100 flights per year. Eventually, SOFIA was retired, with its last flight on September 30, 2022.

The KAO airframe was scrapped in 2023, with some fuselage sections salvaged by MotoArt for its PlaneTags line of collectibles. The cockpit was preserved and will go on display at the Pima Air & Space Museum alongside SOFIA, while the telescope is to be displayed at the Moffett Field Museum.

== See also ==
- Infrared astronomy
- Airborne observatory
