= Moffett Field Museum =

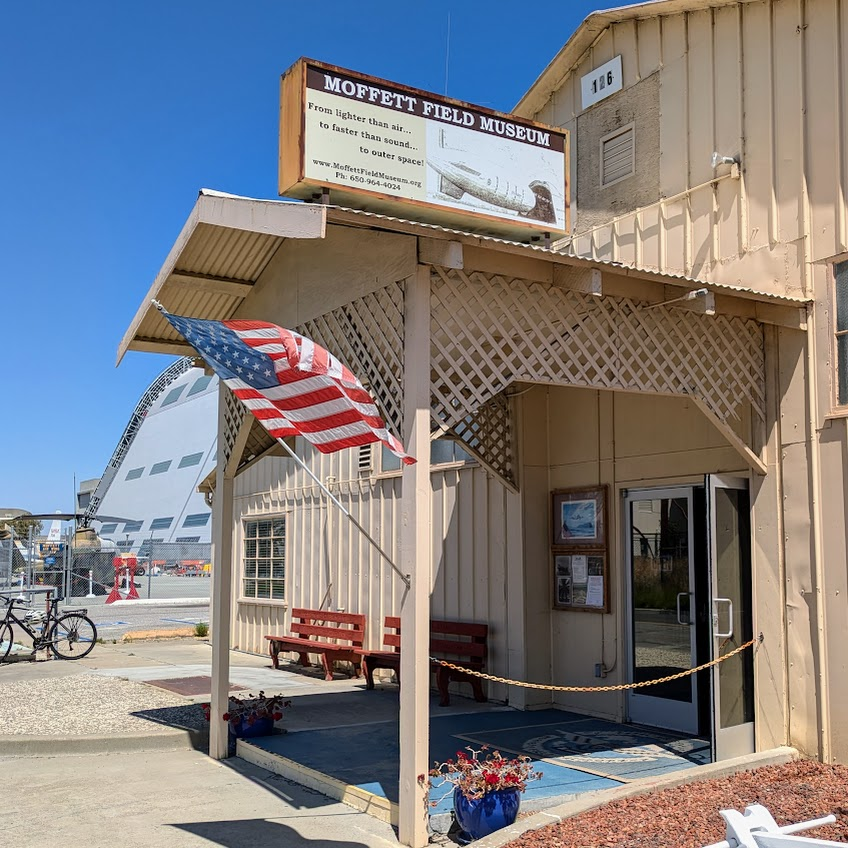
- Museum entrance

- Location within California
- Former name: Moffett Field Historical Society Museum
- Established: 1994
- Location: Mountain View, California
- Coordinates: 37.4113°N 122.0542°W
- Type: Aviation museum
- Founders: Carol Henderson; Rose Lesslie
- Executive director: Jeff Wasel
- Website: www.moffettfieldmuseum.org

The Moffett Field Museum is an aviation museum located at the Moffett Federal Airfield near Mountain View, California, focused on the history of the airport.

== History ==
=== Background ===
Following the 1992 announcement that NAS Moffett Field was closing and the airport would be turned over to the National Air and Space Administration, a group of individuals established the Hail and Farewell Committee to collect historical artifacts related to the base. The Moffett Field Historical Society was founded in May 1993 by Carol Henderson and Rose Lesslie.

=== Establishment ===
The museum originally opened in a 30,000 sq ft (2,800 m^{2}) portion of Hangar One in 1994. For five years the museum was sponsored by the United States Navy Reserve. However, this ended when NASA raised the rent on the hangar in 1999. (Note: In February, the museum opened a "Macon Room" about the airship USS Macon.) At the same time, NASA required the museum to install a sprinkler system. Three years later, in January 2002, the museum was forced to close as it was unable to afford the system.

=== Move ===
The museum reopened in Building 126, a former U.S. Navy recreation center, across the street from Hangar One in April 2005.

The museum opened time capsule in April 2007, but most of the contents were damaged by water.

The museum began preparing a Lockheed U-2C for display in August 2014.

The museum briefly closed in 2017 for upgrades to its HVAC system.

The museum received an official duplicate of Rear Admiral William A. Moffett's Medal of Honor and sword in April 2018.

== Facilities ==
A library is located at the museum.

== Exhibits ==
Exhibits at the museum include electronic warfare, navigation, the USS Macon, a collection of ship's silver serving dishes, Rear Admiral William A. Moffett, memorial, a collection of uniforms, aircrew survival equipment, a Link Trainer, the various aviation organizations at Moffett Field over the years and a room with a model train layout leftover from the building's time as a Navy recreation center.

== Collection ==
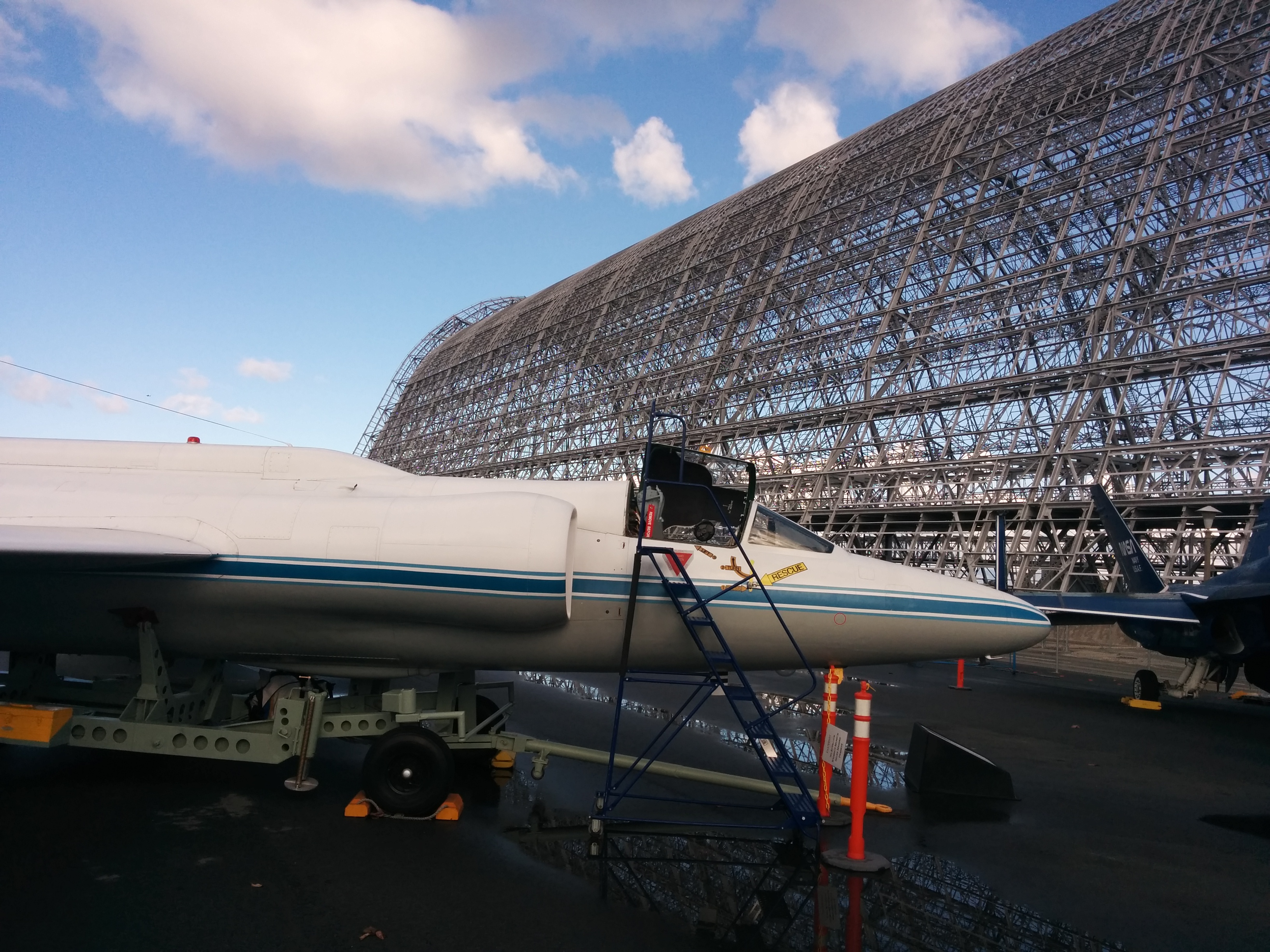
Lockheed ER-2 with Hangar One in the background

- Bell AH-1S Cobra
- Hawker Siddeley AV-8A Harrier – cockpit
- Lockheed U-2C (Note: The U-2Cs used by NASA were replaced by ER-2s in 1981 and 1989. The example on display at the museum was one of the original batch of aircraft and is therefore correctly designated as a U-2 and not an ER-2.)
- Lockheed TF-104G Starfighter
- Lockheed P-3A Orion
- Lockheed TP-3A Orion – cockpit
- McDonnell Douglas F/A-18A Hornet
- Vought F-8A Crusader – cockpit
- Vultee BT-13 Valiant

== Programs ==
The museum hold a bimonthly series of STEM clinics.

== See also ==
- List of aviation museums
