= II Lupi =

Star in the constellation Lupus

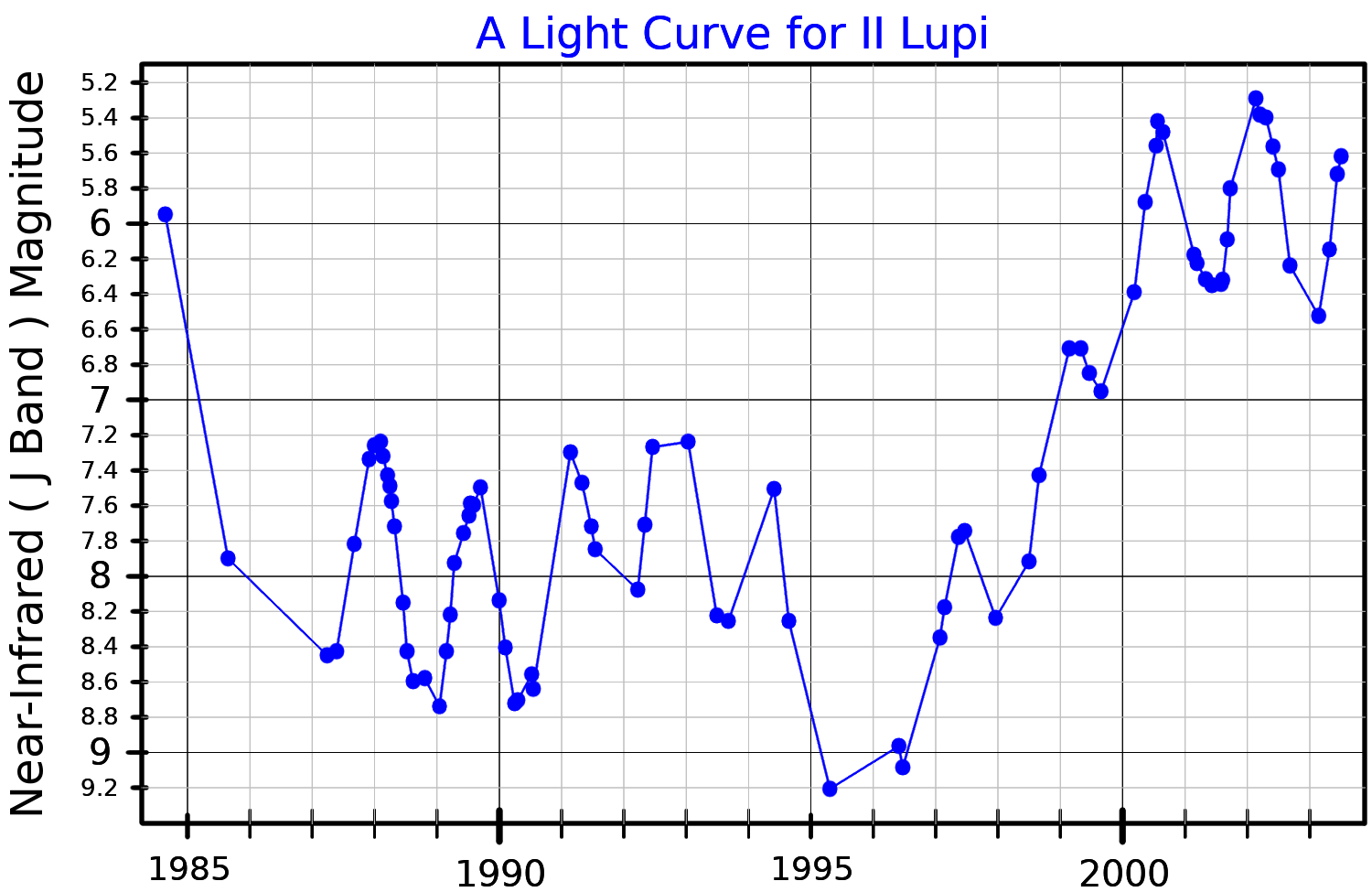
- A near-infrared (J band) light curve for II Lupi, adapted from Lykou et al. (2018)

Observation data Epoch J2000.0 Equinox J2000.0
- Constellation: Lupus
- Right ascension: 15^{h} 23^{m} 05.073^{s}
- Declination: −51° 25′ 58.76″

Characteristics
- Evolutionary stage: asymptotic giant branch
- Spectral type: C
- Apparent magnitude (I): 10.18
- Apparent magnitude (J): 5.92
- Apparent magnitude (K): 1.79
- Variable type: Mira

Astrometry
Proper motion (μ)	RA: −12.992 mas/yr Dec.: −13.119 mas/yr
Parallax (π)	1.5633±0.2138 mas
Distance	approx. 2,100 ly (approx. 640 pc)
Absolute magnitude (M_{V})	−5.15

Details
Mass	2.5±0.5 (initial mass) M_{☉}
Radius	400 to 500 R_{☉}
Luminosity	9,800 L_{☉}
Surface gravity (log g)	0.06 cgs
Temperature	2,570 – 2,860 K
Age	942 Myr

Other designations
- II Lup, IRAS 15194−5115, 2MASS J15230507−5125587, WOS 48, Gaia DR2 5889797405925371392

Database references
SIMBAD	data

II Lupi (IRAS 15194−5115) is a Mira variable and carbon star located in the constellation Lupus. It is the brightest carbon star in the southern hemisphere at 12 μm.

In 1987, the infrared source IRAS 15194−5115 was identified as an extreme carbon star. It was seen to be strongly variable at optical and infrared wavelengths. It is very faint visually, 15th or 16th magnitude in a red filter and below 21st magnitude in a blue filter, but at mid-infrared wavelengths (N band) it is the third-brightest carbon star in the sky. A star at the location had earlier been catalogued as WOS 48, a possible S-type star, on the basis of strong LaO bands in its spectrum.

On the basis of infrared photometry, IRAS 15194−5115 was given the variable star designation II Lupi in 1995, although the variability type was still unknown. More detailed infrared photometry confirmed that II Lupi was a Mira variable and showed regular variations with a period of 575 days over 18 years. The mean magnitude also dimmed and brightened during that time and has been characterised as a 6,900-day secondary period although less than a full cycle was observed. The secondary period could be interpreted as an isolated or irregular obscuration event in a dust shell surrounding the star.

II Lupi has a strong stellar wind averaging 10^{−5} solar masses per year.
