= SuperChannel =

SuperChannel, Super Channel or Super-channel may refer to:

== Television channels ==
- Super Channel (Canadian TV channel), a Canadian pay channel established in November 2007
- Movie Central, the western Canadian pay channel known as "Superchannel" until 2001; ceased operations in 2016. Related to the above in name only, although both incarnations were established by the same organization
- The Movie Network, a separate Canadian (formerly Eastern Canada only) pay channel known as "First Choice Superchannel" in the mid-1980s; related to the above in name only
- NBC Europe, the defunct European satellite television channel known as "Super Channel" or "NBC Super Channel"
- WACX, a religious TV station in Orlando, Florida that uses the SuperChannel branding
- The former name of Super! Drama TV, a Japanese television channel

== Technology ==
- Super-channel, a type of combined networking channel in Dense Wavelength Division Multiplexing

== See also ==
- Superstation
