= Photometric system =

Filters for an optical system

In astronomy, a photometric system is a set of well-defined passbands (or optical filters), with a known sensitivity to incident radiation. The sensitivity usually depends on the optical system, detectors and filters used. For each photometric system a set of primary standard stars is provided.

A commonly adopted standardized photometric system is the Johnson-Morgan or UBV photometric system (1953). At present, there are more than 200 photometric systems.

Photometric systems are usually characterized according to the widths of their passbands:

- broadband (passbands wider than 30 nm, of which the most widely used is Johnson-Morgan UBV system)
- intermediate band (passbands between 10 and 30 nm wide)
- narrow band (passbands less than 10 nm wide)

== Photometric letters ==
Each letter designates a section of light of the electromagnetic spectrum; these cover well the consecutive major groups, near-ultraviolet (NUV), visible light (centered on the V band), near-infrared (NIR) and part of mid-infrared (MIR). (Note: Indigo and cyan are not standard colors. Orange, yellow, and green fall under visual bands, while violet and purple are in every blue band.) The letters are not standards, but are recognized by common agreement among astronomers and astrophysicists.

The use of U,B,V,R,I bands dates from the 1950s, being single-letter abbreviations. (Note: See Description column of the chart)

With the advent of infrared detectors in the next decade, the J to N bands were labelled following on from near-infrared's closest-to-red band, I.

Later the H band was inserted, then Z in the 1990s and finally Y, without changing earlier definitions. Hence, H is out of alphabetical order from its neighbours, while Z,Y are reversed from the alphabetical – higher-wavelength – sub-series which dominates current photometric bands.

| Filter Letter | Effective Wavelength Midpoint λ_{eff} for Standard Filter | Full width at half maximum (Note: The width of the band of the curve's 50% upper values (that is, peak) for a natural curve of paradigm source of this light) (archetypal Bandwidth) (Δλ) (Note: Delta lambda) | Variant(s) | Description |
|---|---|---|---|---|
Ultraviolet
| U | 365 nm | 66 nm | u, u', u* | "U" stands for ultraviolet. |
Visible
| B | 445 nm | 94 nm | b | "B" stands for blue. |
| G | 464 nm | 128 nm | g, g' | "G" stands for green. |
| V | 551 nm | 88 nm | v, v' | "V" stands for visual. |
| R | 658 nm | 138 nm | r, r', R', R_{c}, R_{e}, R_{j} | "R" stands for red. |
Near-Infrared
| I | 806 nm | 149 nm | i, i', I_{c}, I_{e}, I_{j} | "I" stands for infrared. |
| Z | 900 nm | 152 nm | z, z' | |
| Y | 1020 nm | 120 nm | y | |
| J | 1220 nm | 213 nm | J', J_{s} | |
| H | 1630 nm | 307 nm | | |
| K | 2190 nm | 390 nm | K Continuum, K', K_{s}, K_{long}, K^{8}, nbK | |
| L | 3450 nm | 472 nm | L', nbL' | |
Mid-Infrared
| M | 4750 nm | 460 nm | M', nbM | |
| N | 10500 nm | 2500 nm | | |
| Q | 21000 nm | 5800 nm | Q' | |

Note: colors are only approximate and based on wavelength to sRGB representation (when possible).

Combinations of these letters are frequently used; for example the combination JHK has been used more or less as a synonym of "near-infrared", and appears in the title of many papers.

== Filters used ==
The filters currently being used by other telescopes or organizations.

Units of measurements:

- Å = Ångström
- nm = nanometre
- μm = micrometre

| Name | Filters | | | | | | | | | Link |
|---|---|---|---|---|---|---|---|---|---|---|
| 2.2 m telescope at La Silla, ESO | J = 1.24 μm | H = 1.63 μm | K = 2.19 μm | L' = 3.78 μm | M = 4.66 μm | N_{1} = 8.36 μm | N_{2} = 9.67 μm | N_{3} = 12.89 μm | | 2.2 m telescope at La Silla, ESO |
| 2MASS/PAIRITEL | J = 1.25 μm | H = 1.65 μm | K_{s} = 2.15 μm | | | | | | | Two Micron All-Sky Survey, Peters Automated InfraRed Imaging TELescope |
| CFHTLS (Megacam) | u^{*} = 374 nm | g' = 487 nm | r' = 625 nm | i' = 770 nm | z' = 890 nm | | | | | Canada-France-Hawaii Telescope |
| Chandra X-ray Observatory | LETG = 0.08-0.2 keV | HETG = 0.4-10 keV | | | | | | | | Chandra X-ray Observatory |
| CTIO | J = 1.20 μm | H = 1.60 μm | K = 2.20 μm | L = 3.50 μm | | | | | | Cerro Tololo Inter-American Observatory, a division of NOAO |
| Cousins RI photometry | R_{c} = 647 nm | I_{c} = 786.5 nm | | | | | | | | Cousins RI photometry, 1976 |
| the Dark Energy Camera | g = 472.0 nm | r = 641.5 nm | i = 783.5 nm | z = 926.0 nm | Y = 1009.5 nm | | | | | Central wavelengths for bands in the Dark Energy Survey |
| DENIS | I = 0.79 μm | J = 1.24 μm | K = 2.16 μm | | | | | | | Deep Near Infrared Survey |
| Eggen RI photometry | R_{e} = 635 nm | I_{e} = 790 nm | | | | | | | | Eggen RI photometry, 1965 |
| Euclid | VIS = 550–900 nm | Y = 0.95–1.192 μm | J = 1.192–1.544 μm | H = 1.544–2 μm | | | | | | Euclid space telescope |
| FIS | N60 = 65.00 μm | WIDE-S = 90.00 μm | WIDE-L = 145.00 μm | N160 = 160.00 μm | | | | | | Far-Infrared Surveyor on board, AKARI space telescope |
| Gaia | G = 673 nm | G_{BP} = 532 nm | G_{RP} = 797 nm | G_{RVS} = 860 nm | | | | | | Gaia (spacecraft) |
| GALEX | NUV = 175–280 nm | FUV = 135–175 nm | | | | | | | | GALaxy Evolution Explorer |
| GOODS (Hubble ACS) | B = 435 nm | V = 606 nm | i = 775 nm | z = 850 nm | | | | | | Advanced Camera for Surveys on the Hubble Space Telescope |
| HAWC+ | Band 1 = 53 μm | Band 2 = 89 μm | Band 3 = 154 μm | Band 4 = 214 μm | | | | | | High-resolution Airborne Wideband Camera+ for SOFIA |
| HDF | 300 nm | 450 nm | 606 nm | 814 nm | | | | | | Hubble Deep Field from the Hubble Space Telescope |
| IRTF NSFCAM | J = 1.26 μm | H = 1.62 μm | K' = 2.12 μm | K_{s} = 2.15 μm | K = 2.21 μm | L = 3.50 μm | L' = 3.78 μm | M' = 4.78 μm | M = 4.85 μm | NASA Infrared Telescope Facility NSFCAM |
| ISAAC UTI/VLT | J_{s} = 1.2 μm | H = 1.6 μm | K_{s} = 2.2 μm | L = 3.78 μm | Brα = 4.07 μm | | | | | Infrared Spectrometer And Array Camera at Very Large Telescope |
| Johnson system (UBV) | U = 364 nm | B = 442 nm | V = 540 nm | | | | | | | UBV photometric system |
| Vera C. Rubin Observatory (LSST) | u = 320.5–393.5 nm | g = 401.5–551.9 nm | r = 552.0–691.0 nm | i = 691.0–818.0 nm | z = 818.0–923.5 nm | y = 923.8–1084.5 nm | | | | Vera C. Rubin Observatory |
| OMC | Johnson V-filter = 500-580 nm | | | | | | | | | Optical Monitor Camera on INTEGRAL |
| Pan-STARRS | g = 481 nm | r = 617 nm | i = 752 nm | z = 866 nm | y = 962 nm | | | | | Panoramic Survey Telescope And Rapid Response System |
| ProNaOS/SPM | Band 1 = 180-240 μm | Band 2 = 240-340 μm | Band 3 = 340-540 μm | Band 4 = 540-1200 μm | | | | | | PROgramme NAtional d'Observations Submillerètrique/Systéme Photométrique Multibande, balloon-borne experiment |
| Sloan, SDSS | u' = 354 nm | g' = 475 nm | r' = 622 nm | i' = 763 nm | z' = 905 nm | | | | | Sloan Digital Sky Survey |
| SPIRIT III | Band B1 = 4.29 μm | Band B2 = 4.35 μm | Band A = 8.28 μm | Band C = 12.13 μm | Band D = 14.65 μm | Band E = 21.34 μm | | | | Infrared camera on Midcourse Space Experiment |
| Spitzer IRAC | ch1 = 3.6 μm | ch2 = 4.5 μm | ch3 = 5.8 μm | ch4 = 8.0 μm | | | | | | Infrared Array Camera on Spitzer Space Telescope |
| Spitzer MIPS | 24 μm | 70 μm | 160 μm | | | | | | | Multiband Imaging Photometer for Spitzer on Spitzer |
| Stromvil filters | U = 345 nm | P = 374 nm | S = 405 nm | Y = 466 nm | Z = 516 nm | V = 544 nm | S = 656 nm | | | Stromvil photometry |
| Strömgren filters | u = 350 nm | v = 411 nm | b = 467 nm | y = 547 nm | β narrow = 485.8 nm | β wide = 485 nm | | | | Strömgren photometric system |
| UKIDSS (WFCAM) | Z = 882 nm | Y = 1031 nm | J = 1248 nm | H = 1631 nm | K = 2201 nm | | | | | UKIRT Infrared Deep Sky Survey |
| Vilnius photometric system | U = 345 nm | P = 374 nm | S = 405 nm | Y = 466 nm | Z = 516 nm | V = 544 nm | S = 656 nm | | | Vilnius photometric system |
| VISTA IRC | Z = 0.88 μm | Y = 1.02 μm | J = 1.25 μm | H = 1.65 μm | K_{s} = 2.20 μm | NB1.18 = 1.18 μm | | | | Visible & Infrared Survey Telescope for Astronomy |
| WISE | W1 = 3.4 μm | W2 = 4.6 μm | W3 = 12 μm | W4 = 22 μm | | | | | | Wide-field Infrared Survey Explorer |
| XMM-Newton OM | UVW2 = 212 nm | UVM2 = 231 nm | UVW1 = 291 nm | U = 344 nm | B = 450 nm | V = 543 nm | | | | XMM-Newton Optical/UV Monitor |
| XEST Survey | UVW2 = 212 nm | UVM2 = 231 nm | UVW1 = 291 nm | U = 344 nm | B = 450 nm | V = 543 nm | J = 1.25 μm | H = 1.65 μm | K_{s} = 2.15 μm | Survey includes the point source of 2MASS with XMM-Newton OM |

Note: colors are only approximate and based on wavelength to sRGB representation (when possible).

== See also ==
- Photometry
- AB magnitude
