= M band (disambiguation) =

M band may refer to:

- M band (NATO), a millimetre wave band from 60 to 100 GHz
- M band (infrared), an atmospheric transmission window centred on 4.7 μm
- M (band), a new-wave musical group of the late 1970s and 1980s
- M-band, part of a sarcomere
