= PKS 2225−308 =

Radio galaxy in the constellation Piscis Austrinus

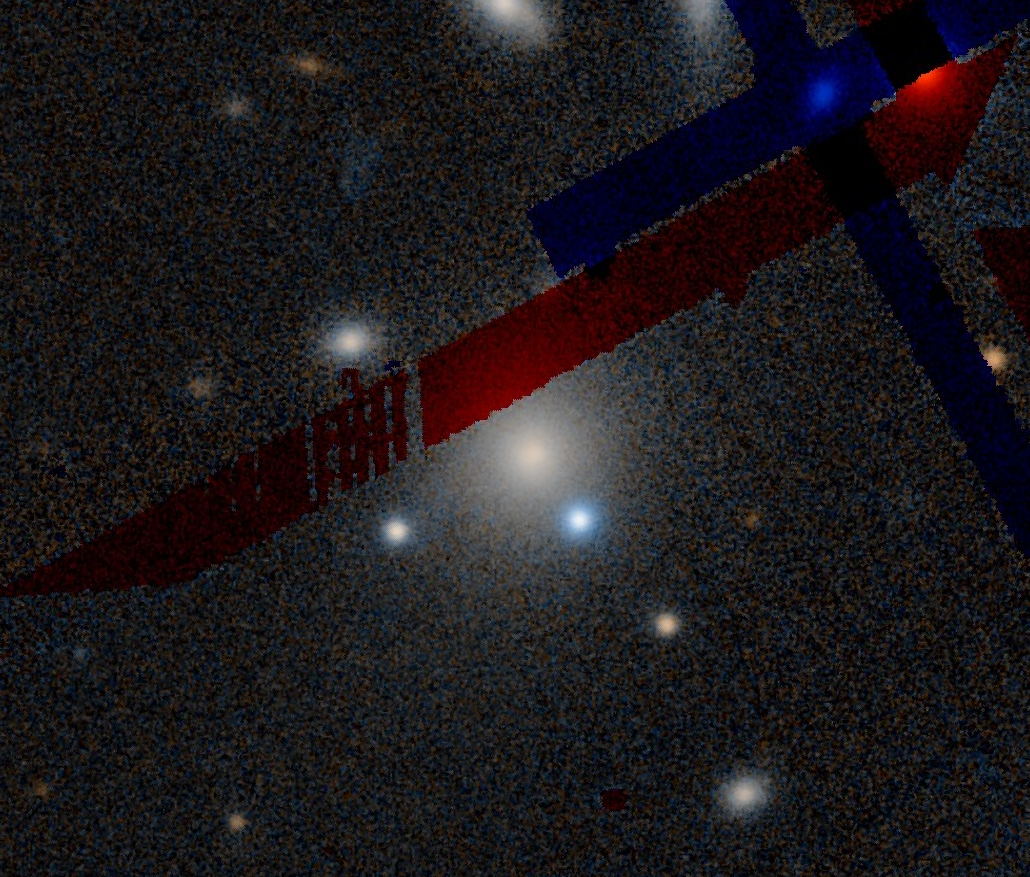
- Pan-STARRS image of PKS 2225−308

Observation data (J2000 epoch)
- Constellation: Piscis Austrinus
- Right ascension: 22^{h} 27^{m} 54.47^{s}
- Declination: −30° 34′ 31.69″
- Redshift: 0.058057
- Heliocentric radial velocity: 17,405 ± 35 km/s
- Distance: 839.0 ± 58.8 Mly (257.24 ± 18.02 Mpc)
- Group or cluster: Abell 3880
- magnitude (J): 11.58

Characteristics
- Type: cD;E+3;BrClG
- Size: ~597,000 ly (183.1 kpc) (estimated)

Other designations
- 2MASX J22275446−3034321, 2dFGRS S338Z021, Abell 3880:[AAV2011] BCG, PGC 68924, NVSS J222754−303431, PMN J2227−3033, SUMSS J222754−303431, WINGS J222754.43−303431.8

PKS 2225−308 is a radio galaxy located in the constellation of Piscis Austrinus. The redshift of the galaxy is (z) 0.058 and it was first discovered as an N galaxy from a survey by S.A. Grandi in August 1983. The galaxy is known to host a radio source and also a member of the galaxy cluster Abell 3880, residing as the brightest cluster galaxy (BCG).

== Description ==
PKS 2225−308 is classified as a Fanaroff-Riley Class Type 1 gamma-ray emitting radio galaxy with the total gamma-ray luminosity estimated to be 43.09 Lγ. The central supermassive black hole is estimated to be 9.40 M_{☉}. The host is classified to be a massive elliptical galaxy with the brightness profile best described by a de Vaucouleurs law model.

The radio source of the galaxy is described as compact and is found to have a head-tail morphology. The radio structure of the source is classified as a double with components that are shown as slightly extended. There is also a radio core detected at parsec-scales, with the total flux density being estimated as 30 mJy based on radio observations made by Very Large Array (VLA) at 4.9 GHz frequencies. At 10 GHz, the core flux density is estimated to be 21.1 ± 9.3 mJy.

The total radio luminosity has been estimated as -0.08 × 10^{24} W Hz^{−1}. A study has also found presence of X-ray cavities with the cavity power being estimated as 73.4 ± 4.1 × 10^{42} erg s^{−1}. C-band and X-band imaging also found there is an extended structure shown on one side.
