= Transponder =

Device that emits an identifying signal in response to a received signal

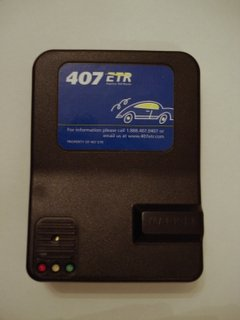
An Ontario Highway 407 toll transponder circa 2009

In telecommunications, a transponder is a device that, upon receiving a signal, emits a different signal in response. The term is a blend of transmitter and responder.

In air navigation or radio frequency identification, a flight transponder is an automated transceiver in an aircraft that emits a coded identifying signal in response to an interrogating received signal.

In a communications satellite, a satellite transponder receives signals over a range of uplink frequencies, usually from a satellite ground station; the transponder amplifies them, and re-transmits them on a different set of downlink frequencies to receivers on Earth, often without changing the content of the received signal or signals.

== Satellite/broadcast communications ==
A communications satellite’s channels are called transponders because each is a separate transceiver or repeater. With digital video data compression and multiplexing, several video and audio channels may travel through a single transponder on a single wideband carrier. Original analog video only has one channel per transponder, with subcarriers for audio and automatic transmission identification service (ATIS). Non-multiplexed radio stations can also travel in single channel per carrier (SCPC) mode, with multiple carriers (analog or digital) per transponder. This allows each station to transmit directly to the satellite, rather than paying for a whole transponder, or using landlines to send it to an earth station for multiplexing with other stations.

== Optical communications ==
In fiber-optic communications, a transponder is the element that sends and receives the optical signal from a fiber. A transponder is typically characterized by its data rate and the maximum distance the signal can travel.

The term "transponder" can apply to different items with important functional differences, mentioned across academic and commercial literature:

- according to one description, a transponder and transceiver are both functionally similar devices that convert a full-duplex electrical signal into a full-duplex optical signal. The difference between the two is that transceivers interface electrically with the host system using a serial interface, whereas transponders use a parallel interface to do so. In this view, transponders provide easier-to-handle lower-rate parallel signals, but are bulkier and consume more power than transceivers.
- according to another description, transceivers are limited to providing an electrical-optical function only (not differentiating between serial or parallel electrical interfaces), whereas transponders convert an optical signal at one wavelength to an optical signal at another wavelength (typically ITU standardized for DWDM communication). As such, transponders can be considered as two transceivers placed back-to-back. This view also seems to be held by, for example, Fujitsu.

As a result, differences in transponder functionality also might influence the functional description of related optical modules like transceivers and muxponders.

== Aviation ==
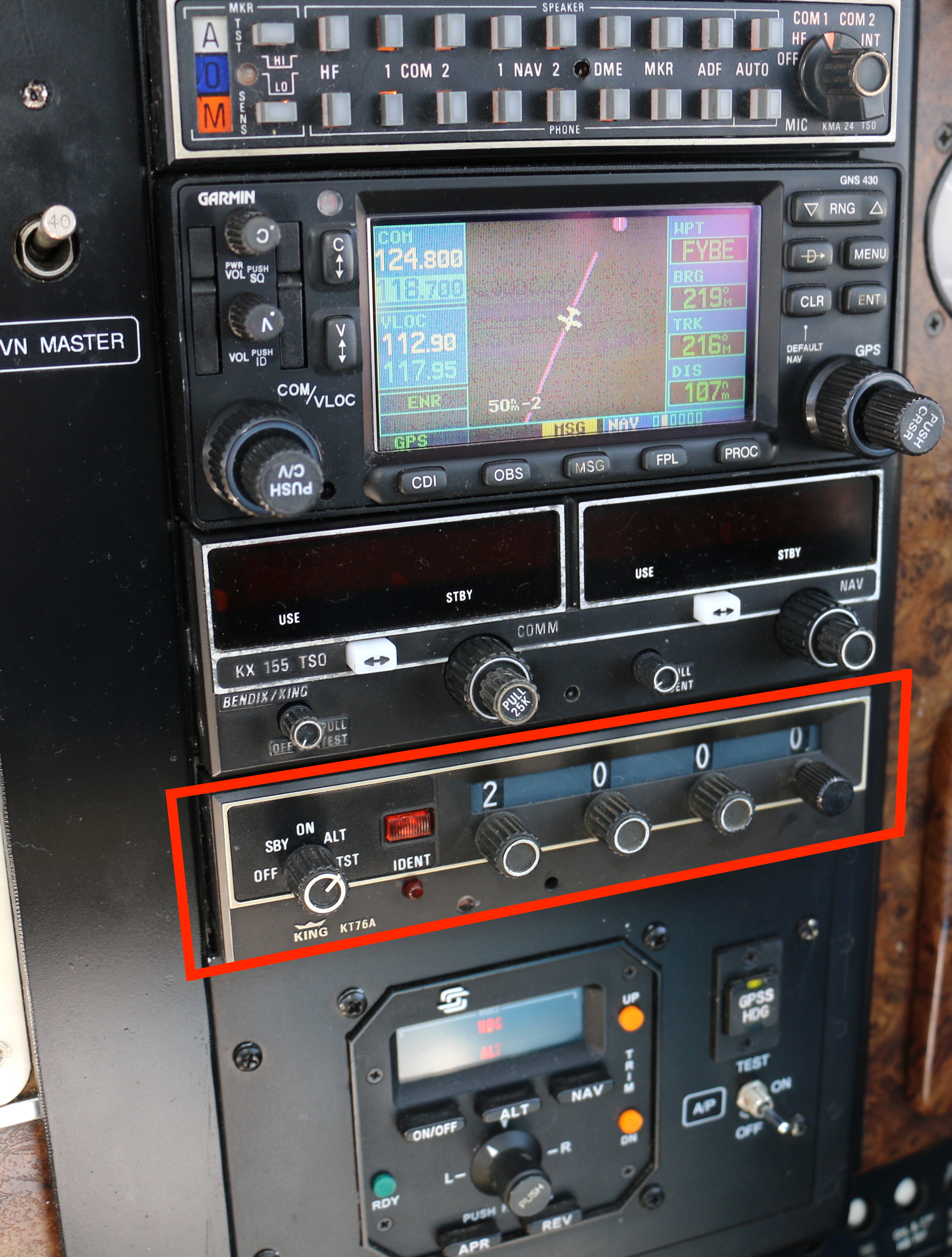
A transponder in a private plane squawking 2000

Another type of transponder occurs in identification friend or foe (IFF) systems in military aviation and in air traffic control secondary surveillance radar (beacon radar) systems for general aviation and commercial aviation.

Primary radar works best with large all-metal aircraft, but not so well on small, composite aircraft. Its range is also limited by terrain and rain or snow and also detects unwanted objects such as automobiles, hills and trees. Furthermore, it cannot always estimate the altitude of an aircraft. Secondary radar overcomes these limitations but it depends on a transponder in the aircraft to respond to interrogations from the ground station to make the plane more visible.

Depending on the type of interrogation, the transponder sends back a transponder code (or "squawk code", Mode A) or altitude information (Mode C) to help air traffic controllers to identify the aircraft and to maintain separation between planes. Another mode called Mode S (Mode Select) is designed to help avoiding over-interrogation of the transponder (having many radars in busy areas) and to allow automatic collision avoidance. Mode S transponders are backward compatible with Modes A and C. Mode S is mandatory in controlled airspace in many countries. Some countries have also required, or are moving toward requiring, that all aircraft be equipped with Mode S, even in uncontrolled airspace. However, in the field of general aviation there have been objections to these moves, because of the cost, size, limited benefit to the users in uncontrolled airspace, and, in the case of balloons and gliders, the power requirements during long flights.

Transponders are used on some military aircraft to ensure ground personnel can verify the functionality of a missile's flight termination system prior to launch. Such radar-enhancing transponders are needed as the enclosed weapon bays on modern aircraft interfere with prelaunch, flight termination system verification performed by range safety personnel during training test launches. The transponders re-radiate the signals allowing for much longer communication distances.

=== Marine ===
The International Maritime Organization's International Convention for the Safety of Life at Sea (SOLAS) requires the Automatic Identification System (AIS) to be fitted aboard international voyaging ships with 300 or more gross tonnage (GT), and all passenger ships regardless of size. AIS transmitters/receivers are generally called transponders, but they generally transmit autonomously, although coast stations can interrogate class B transponders on smaller vessels for additional information. In addition, navigational aids often have transponders called RACON (radar beacons) designed to make them stand out on a ship's radar screen.

Sonar transponders operate under water and are used to measure distance and form the basis of underwater location marking, position tracking and navigation.

== Other applications ==
=== Electronic toll collection ===
Electronic toll collection systems such as E-ZPass in the eastern United States use RFID transponders to identify vehicles.

=== Lap timing ===
Transponders are used in races for lap timing. A cable loop is dug into the race circuit near to the start/finish line. Each individual runner or car has an active transponder with a unique ID code. When the individual passes the start/finish line, the lap time and the racing position is shown on the score board.

Passive and active RFID systems are used in motor sports, and off-road events such as Enduro and Hare and Hounds racing, the riders have a transponder on their person, normally on their arm. When they complete a lap they swipe or touch the receiver which is connected to a computer and log their lap time.

NASCAR uses transponders and cable loops placed at numerous points around the track to determine the lineup during a caution period. This system replaced a dangerous race back to the start-finish line.

=== Car keys ===
Many modern automobiles have keys with transponders hidden inside the plastic head of the key. The user of the car may not even be aware that the transponder is there, because there are no buttons to press. When a key is inserted into the ignition lock cylinder and turned, the car's computer sends a signal to the transponder. Unless the transponder replies with a valid code, the computer will not allow the engine to be started. Transponder keys have no battery; they are energized by the signal itself.

=== Gated communities ===
Transponders may also be used by residents to enter their gated communities. However, having more than one transponder causes problems. If a resident's car with simple transponder is parked in the vicinity, any vehicle can come up to the automated gate, triggering the gate interrogation signal, which may get an acceptable response from the resident's car. Such units properly installed might involve beamforming, unique transponders for each vehicle, or simply obliging vehicles to be stored away from the gate.

== See also ==
- Acronyms and abbreviations in avionics
- Transponder car key
- Transceiver
- Muxponder
- Rebecca/Eureka transponding radar
