= IPoDWDM =

IP-only optical network

IP over DWDM (IPoDWDM) is a technology used in telecommunications networks to integrate IP routers and network switches in the OTN (Optical Transport Network). A true IPoDWDM solution is implemented only when the IP Routers and Switches support ITU-T G.709. In this way IP devices can monitor the optical path and implement the transport functionality as FEC (Forward Error Correction) specified by ITU-T G.709/Y.1331 or Super FEC functionality defined in ITU-T G.975.1.

== Benefits ==
This approach saves network components including shelves, processors, interfaces cards and hence it permits to reduce the power consumption, OPEX (Operational expenditure) and CAPEX (capital expenditure). This approach brings also a simplification of the network, eliminating the SDH/SONET intermediate layer.

== Multivendors ==
A DWDM network can be implemented using different vendor technology from the IP devices as long as they support alien wavelength transmission specified by ITU-T G.698.2.
