= Alien wavelength =

Type of optical signal

In the context of wavelength-division multiplexing, an alien wavelength is a "colored" optical signal that is originated from equipment not under the direct control of the transmission network operator. This technique was first mentioned in 2009.

Alien Wave transport involves transparent transmission of colored optical channels over pre-existing third-party physical infrastructure. In other words, Alien Wave transport implies an innovative spectrum utilization arrangement between an optical infrastructure owner and a bandwidth crippled customer. The fact that multiple providers co-exist and utilize the common fiber and optical layer infrastructure turns out to be a viable and cost-effective way to scale-up network capacity through minimal capital and operational investments.

A practical example of an Alien Wave implementation is one where network resources owned by one carrier are being utilized to transport optical channels that are in the control of a secondary carrier. The possibility of Alien Wave insertion without any impact to existing services has resulted in a rapid acceptance of this technology by the telecom service provider community.

== See also ==
- Dark fiber
