= C band (infrared) =

Wavelength range of light

Absorption in fiber in the range 900–1700 nm with a minimum at the C-band

Transmittance of the atmosphere around the C-band

In infrared optical communications, C-band (C for "conventional") refers to the wavelength range 1530–1565 nm, which corresponds to the amplification range of erbium doped fiber amplifiers (EDFAs). The C-band is located around the absorption minimum in optical fiber, where the loss reaches values as good as 0.2 dB/km, as well as an atmospheric transmission window (see figures). The C-band is located between the short wavelengths (S) band (1460–1530 nm) and the long wavelengths (L) band (1565–1625 nm). It includes the 100 GHz-spaced DWDM ITU channels 16 (1564.68 nm, 191.6 THz) to 59 (1530.33 nm, 195.9 THz).

DWDM Channel Chart for 100GHz and 50GHz Systems:

DWDM ITU Grid 100GHz Channels
#	GHz	nm	#	GHz	nm
1	190100	1577.03	37	193700	1547.72
2	190200	1576.20	38	193800	1546.92
3	190300	1575.37	39	193900	1546.12
4	190400	1574.54	40	194000	1545.32
5	190500	1573.71	41	194100	1544.53
6	190600	1572.89	42	194200	1543.73
7	190700	1572.06	43	194300	1542.94
8	190800	1571.24	44	194400	1542.14
9	190900	1570.42	45	194500	1541.35
10	191000	1569.59	46	194600	1540.56
11	191100	1568.77	47	194700	1539.77
12	191200	1567.95	48	194800	1538.98
13	191300	1567.13	49	194900	1538.19
14	191400	1566.31	50	195000	1537.40
15	191500	1565.50	51	195100	1536.61
16	191600	1564.68	52	195200	1535.82
17	191700	1563.86	53	195300	1535.04
18	191800	1563.05	54	195400	1534.25
19	191900	1562.23	55	195500	1533.47
20	192000	1561.42	56	195600	1532.68
21	192100	1560.61	57	195700	1531.90
22	192200	1559.79	58	195800	1531.12
23	192300	1558.98	59	195900	1530.33
24	192400	1558.17	60	196000	1529.55
25	192500	1557.36	61	196100	1528.77
26	192600	1556.56	62	196200	1527.99
27	192700	1555.75	63	196300	1527.22
28	192800	1554.94	64	196400	1526.44
29	192900	1554.13	65	196500	1525.66
30	193000	1553.33	66	196600	1524.89
31	193100	1552.52	67	196700	1524.11
32	193200	1551.72	68	196800	1523.34
33	193300	1550.92	69	196900	1522.56
34	193400	1550.12	70	197000	1521.79
35	193500	1549.32	71	197100	1521.02
36	193600	1548.52	72	197200	1520.25

DWDM ITU Grid 50GHz Channels
#	GHz	nm	#	GHz	nm
1	190100	1577.03	37	193700	1547.72
1.5	190150	1576.61	37.5	193750	1547.32
2	190200	1576.20	38	193800	1546.92
2.5	190250	1575.78	38.5	193850	1546.52
3	190300	1575.37	39	193900	1546.12
3.5	190350	1574.95	39.5	193950	1545.72
4	190400	1574.54	40	194000	1545.32
4.5	190450	1574.13	40.5	194050	1544.92
5	190500	1573.71	41	194100	1544.53
5.5	190550	1573.30	41.5	194150	1544.13
6	190600	1572.89	42	194200	1543.73
6.5	190650	1572.48	42.5	194250	1543.33
7	190700	1572.06	43	194300	1542.94
7.5	190750	1571.65	43.5	194350	1542.54
8	190800	1571.24	44	194400	1542.14
8.5	190850	1570.83	44.5	194450	1541.75
9	190900	1570.42	45	194500	1541.35
9.5	190950	1570.01	45.5	194550	1540.95
10	191000	1569.59	46	194600	1540.56
10.5	191050	1569.18	46.5	194650	1540.16
11	191100	1568.77	47	194700	1539.77
11.5	191150	1568.36	47.5	194750	1539.37
12	191200	1567.95	48	194800	1538.98
12.5	191250	1567.54	48.5	194850	1538.58
13	191300	1567.13	49	194900	1538.19
13.5	191350	1566.72	49.5	194950	1537.79
14	191400	1566.31	50	195000	1537.40
14.5	191450	1565.90	50.5	195050	1537.00
15	191500	1565.50	51	195100	1536.61
15.5	191550	1565.09	51.5	195150	1536.22
16	191600	1564.68	52	195200	1535.82
16.5	191650	1564.27	52.5	195250	1535.43
17	191700	1563.86	53	195300	1535.04
17.5	191750	1563.45	53.5	195350	1534.64
18	191800	1563.05	54	195400	1534.25
18.5	191850	1562.64	54.5	195450	1533.86
19	191900	1562.23	55	195500	1533.47
19.5	191950	1561.83	55.5	195550	1533.07
20	192000	1561.42	56	195600	1532.68
20.5	192050	1561.01	56.5	195650	1532.29
21	192100	1560.61	57	195700	1531.90
21.5	192150	1560.20	57.5	195750	1531.51
22	192200	1559.79	58	195800	1531.12
22.5	192250	1559.39	58.5	195850	1530.72
23	192300	1558.98	59	195900	1530.33
23.5	192350	1558.58	59.5	195950	1529.94
24	192400	1558.17	60	196000	1529.55
24.5	192450	1557.77	60.5	196050	1529.16
25	192500	1557.36	61	196100	1528.77
25.5	192550	1556.96	61.5	196150	1528.38
26	192600	1556.56	62	196200	1527.99
26.5	192650	1556.15	62.5	196250	1527.60
27	192700	1555.75	63	196300	1527.22
27.5	192750	1555.34	63.5	196350	1526.83
28	192800	1554.94	64	196400	1526.44
28.5	192850	1554.54	64.5	196450	1526.05
29	192900	1554.13	65	196500	1525.66
29.5	192950	1553.73	65.5	196550	1525.27
30	193000	1553.33	66	196600	1524.89
30.5	193050	1552.93	66.5	196650	1524.50
31	193100	1552.52	67	196700	1524.11
31.5	193150	1552.12	67.5	196750	1523.72
32	193200	1551.72	68	196800	1523.34
32.5	193250	1551.32	68.5	196850	1522.95
33	193300	1550.92	69	196900	1522.56
33.5	193350	1550.52	69.5	196950	1522.18
34	193400	1550.12	70	197000	1521.79
34.5	193450	1549.72	70.5	197050	1521.40
35	193500	1549.32	71	197100	1521.02
35.5	193550	1548.91	71.5	197150	1520.63
36	193600	1548.52	72	197200	1520.25
36.5	193650	1548.11	72.5	197250	1519.86
