= Infrared astronomy =

Observation of infrared wavelengths

Infrared astronomy is a sub-discipline of astronomy which specializes in the observation and analysis of astronomical objects using infrared (IR) radiation. The wavelength of infrared light ranges from 0.75 to 300 micrometers, and falls in between visible radiation, which ranges from 380 to 750 nanometers, and submillimeter waves.

Infrared astronomy began in the 1830s, a few decades after the discovery of infrared light by William Herschel in 1800. Early progress was limited, and it was not until the early 20th century that conclusive detections of astronomical objects other than the Sun and Moon were made in infrared light. After a number of discoveries were made in the 1950s and 1960s in radio astronomy, astronomers realized the information available outside the visible wavelength range, and modern infrared astronomy was established.

Infrared and optical astronomy are often practiced using the same telescopes, as the same mirrors or lenses are usually effective over a wavelength range that includes both visible and infrared light. Both fields also use solid state detectors, though the specific type of solid state photodetectors used are different. Infrared light is absorbed at many wavelengths by water vapor in the Earth's atmosphere, so most infrared telescopes are at high elevations in dry places, above as much of the atmosphere as possible. There have also been infrared observatories in space, including the Spitzer Space Telescope, the Herschel Space Observatory, and more recently the James Webb Space Telescope.

== History ==
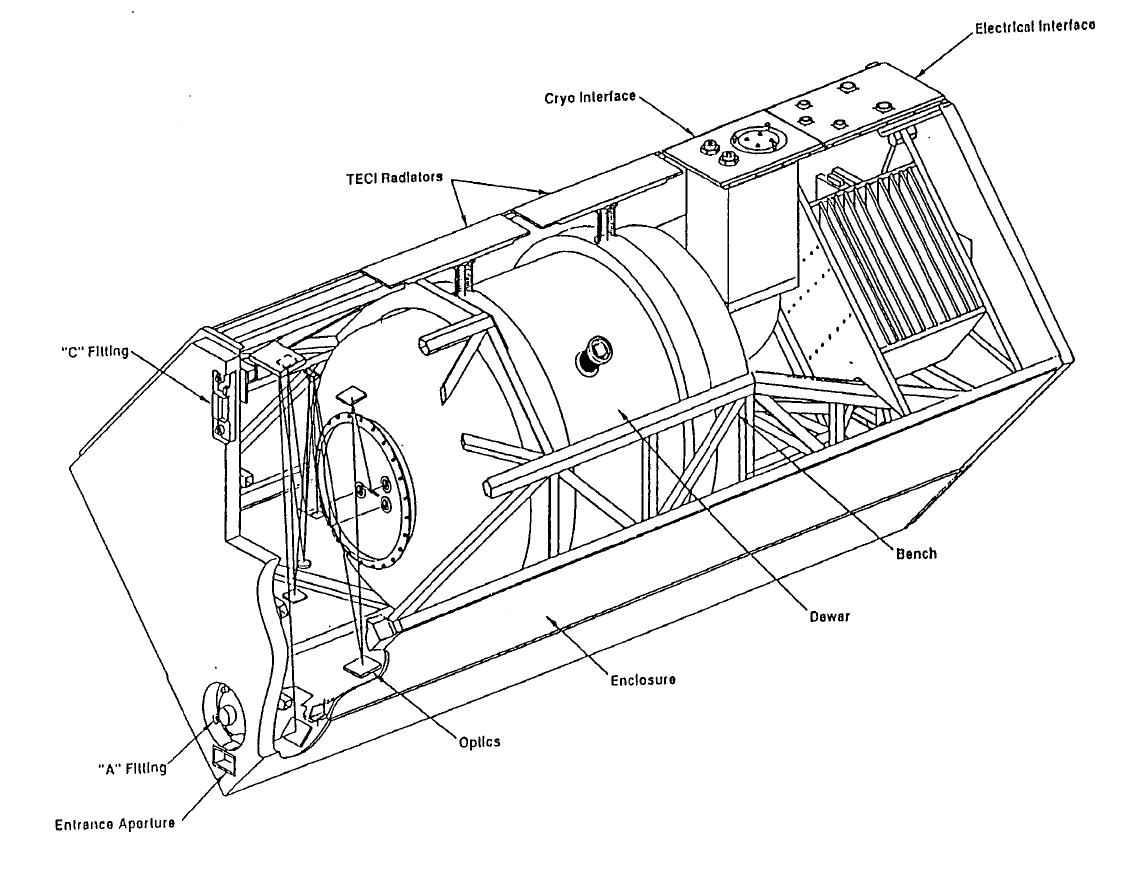
Hubble's ground-breaking near-infrared NICMOS

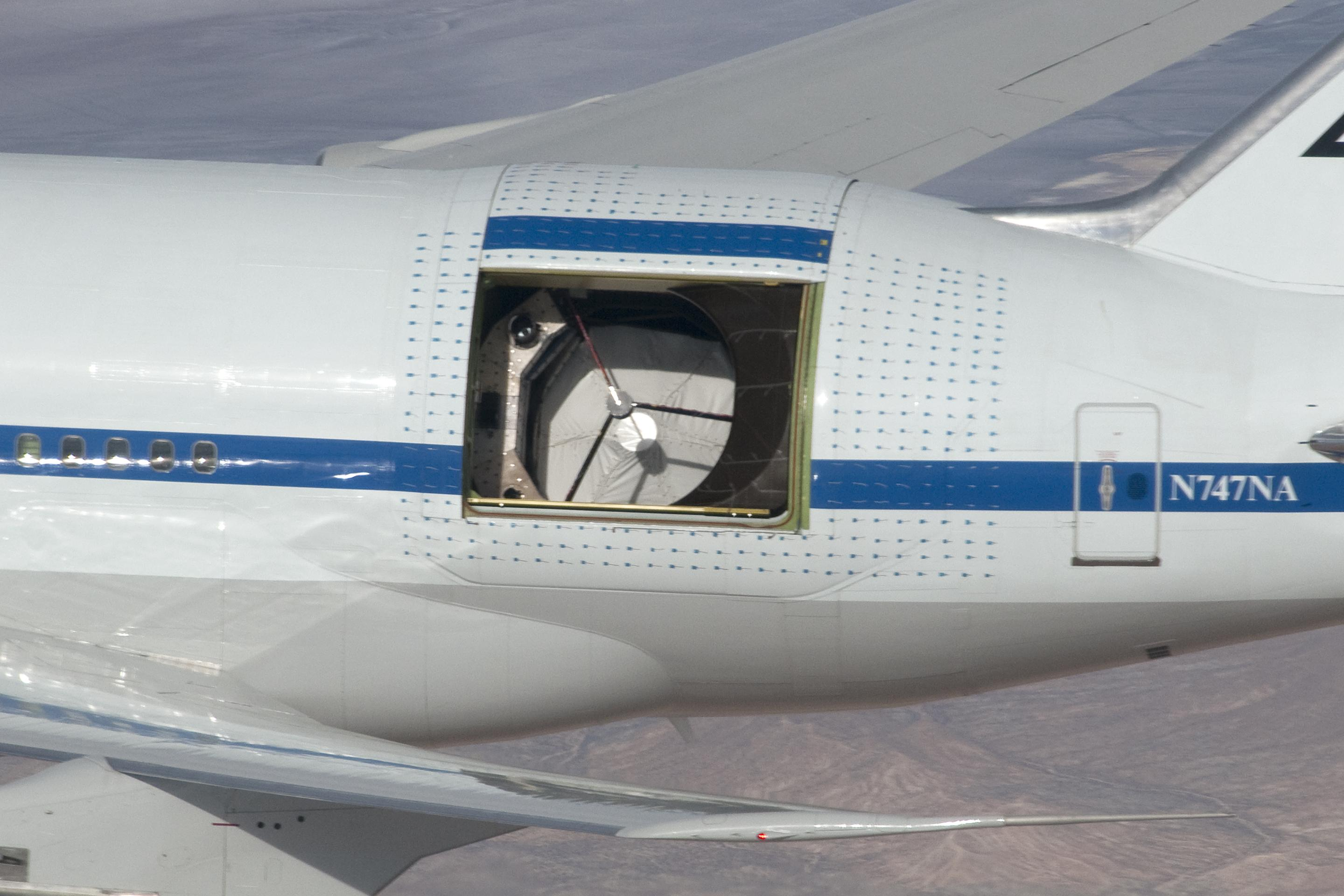
SOFIA is an infrared telescope in an aircraft, shown here in a 2009 test

The discovery of infrared radiation is attributed to William Herschel, who performed an experiment in 1800 where he placed a thermometer in sunlight of different colors after it passed through a prism. He noticed that the temperature increase induced by sunlight was highest outside the visible spectrum, just beyond the red color. That the temperature increase was highest at infrared wavelengths was due to the spectral response of the prism rather than properties of the Sun, but the fact that there was any temperature increase at all prompted Herschel to deduce that there was invisible radiation from the Sun. He dubbed this radiation "calorific rays", and went on to show that it could be reflected, transmitted, and absorbed just like visible light.

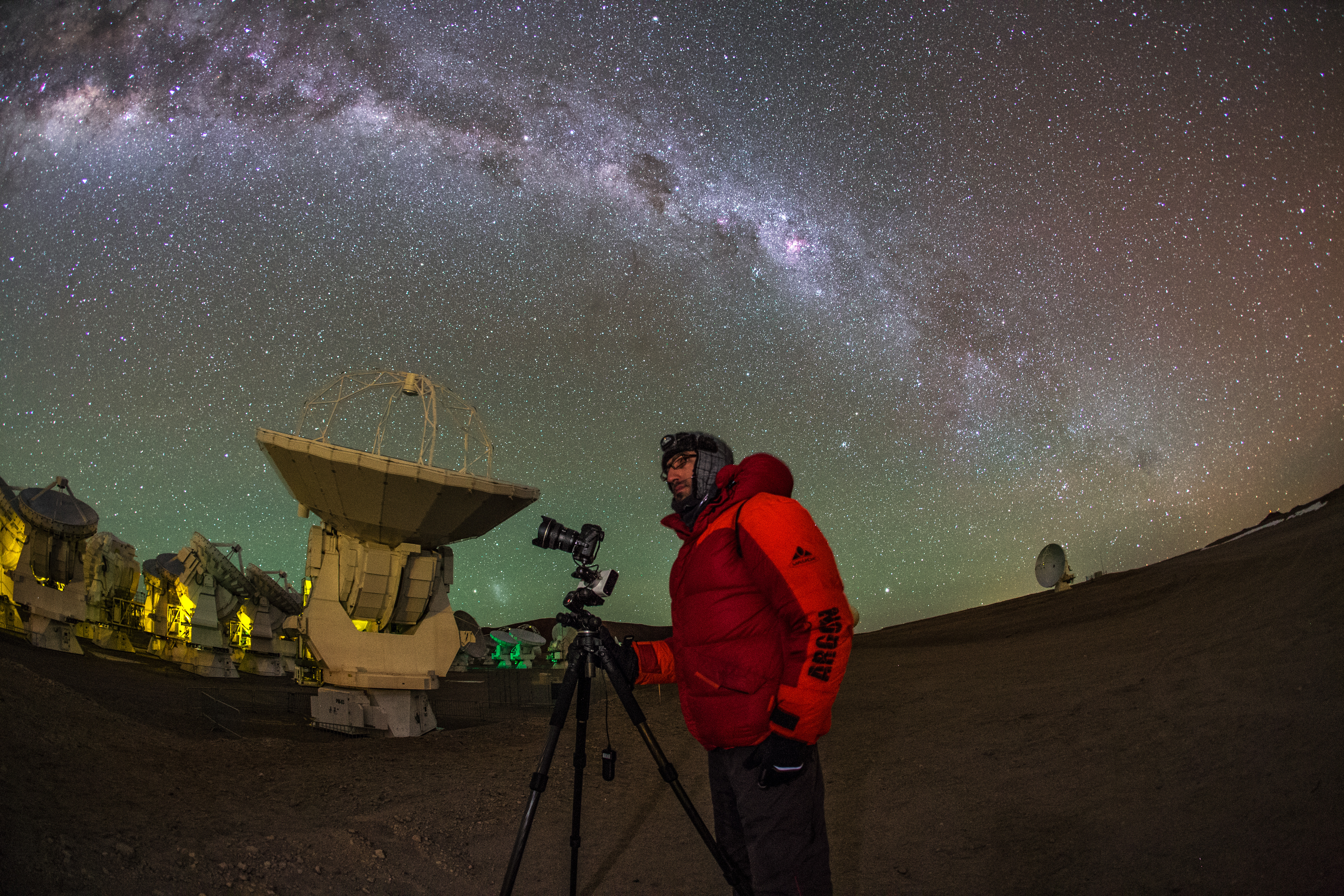
High on the Chajnantor Plateau, the Atacama Large Millimeter Array provides an extraordinary place for infrared astronomy.

Efforts were made starting in the 1830s and continuing through the 19th century to detect infrared radiation from other astronomical sources. Radiation from the Moon was first detected in 1856 by Charles Piazzi Smyth, the Astronomer Royal for Scotland, during an expedition to Tenerife to test his ideas about mountain top astronomy. Ernest Fox Nichols used a modified Crookes radiometer in an attempt to detect infrared radiation from Arcturus and Vega, but Nichols deemed the results inconclusive. Even so, the ratio of flux he reported for the two stars is consistent with the modern value, so George Rieke gives Nichols credit for the first detection of a star other than our own in the infrared.

The field of infrared astronomy continued to develop slowly in the early 20th century, as Seth Barnes Nicholson and Edison Pettit developed thermopile detectors capable of accurate infrared photometry and sensitive to a few hundreds of stars. The field was mostly neglected by traditional astronomers until the 1960s, with most scientists who practiced infrared astronomy having actually been trained physicists. The success of radio astronomy during the 1950s and 1960s, combined with the improvement of infrared detector technology, prompted more astronomers to take notice, and infrared astronomy became well established as a subfield of astronomy.

Infrared space telescopes entered service. Early infrared sky surveys were carried out by the United States Air Force using sounding rockets. In 1983, IRAS made an all-sky survey. In 1995, the European Space Agency created the Infrared Space Observatory. Before this satellite ran out of liquid helium in 1998, it discovered protostars and water in our universe (even on Saturn and Uranus).

On 25 August 2003, NASA launched the Spitzer Space Telescope, previously known as the Space Infrared Telescope Facility. In 2009, the telescope ran out of liquid helium and lost the ability to see far infrared. It had discovered stars, the Double Helix Nebula, and light from extrasolar planets. It continued working in 3.6 and 4.5 micrometer bands. Since then, other infrared telescopes helped find new stars that are forming, nebulae, and stellar nurseries. Infrared telescopes have opened up a whole new part of the galaxy for us. They are also useful for observing extremely distant things, like quasars. Quasars move away from Earth. The resulting large redshift make them difficult targets with an optical telescope. Infrared telescopes give much more information about them.

During May 2008, a group of international infrared astronomers proved that intergalactic dust greatly dims the light of distant galaxies. In actuality, galaxies are almost twice as bright as they look. The dust absorbs much of the visible light and re-emits it as infrared light.

== Modern infrared astronomy ==
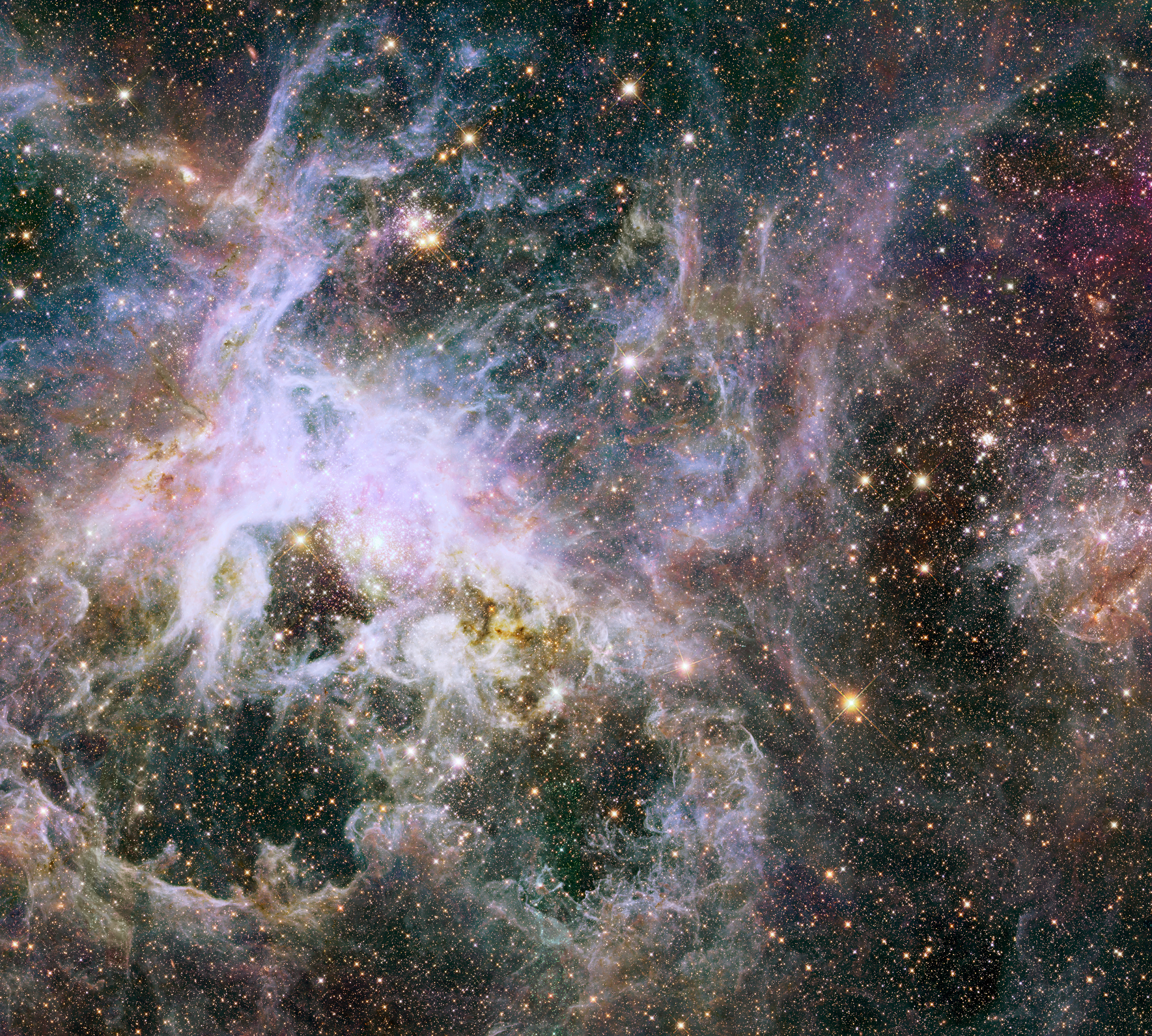
Hubble infrared view of the Tarantula Nebula.

Infrared radiation with wavelengths just longer than visible light, known as near-infrared, behaves in a very similar way to visible light, and can be detected using similar solid state devices (because of this, many quasars, stars, and galaxies were discovered). For this reason, the near infrared region of the spectrum is commonly incorporated as part of the "optical" spectrum, along with the near ultraviolet. Many optical telescopes, such as those at Keck Observatory, operate effectively in the near infrared as well as at visible wavelengths. The far-infrared extends to submillimeter wavelengths, which are observed by telescopes such as the James Clerk Maxwell Telescope at Mauna Kea Observatory.

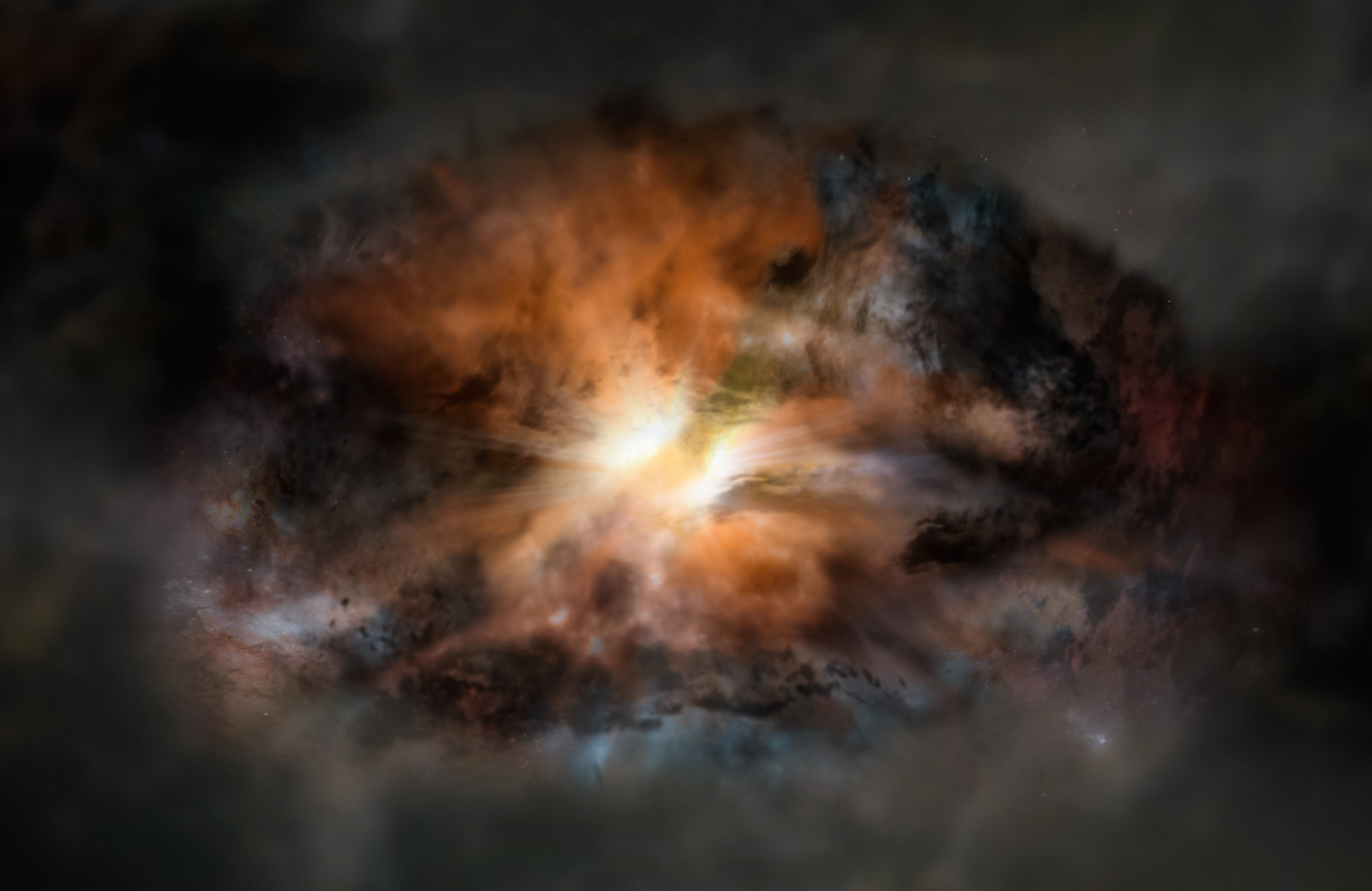
Artist impression of galaxy W2246-0526, a single galaxy glowing in infrared light as intensely as 350 trillion Suns.

Like all other forms of electromagnetic radiation, infrared is utilized by astronomers to study the universe. Indeed, infrared measurements taken by the 2MASS and WISE astronomical surveys have been particularly effective at unveiling previously undiscovered star clusters. Examples of such embedded star clusters are FSR 1424, FSR 1432, Camargo 394, Camargo 399, Majaess 30, and Majaess 99. Infrared telescopes, which includes most major optical telescopes as well as a few dedicated infrared telescopes, need to be chilled with liquid nitrogen and shielded from warm objects. The reason for this is that objects with temperatures of a few hundred kelvins emit most of their thermal energy at infrared wavelengths. If infrared detectors were not kept cooled, the radiation from the detector itself would contribute noise that would dwarf the radiation from any celestial source. This is particularly important in the mid-infrared and far-infrared regions of the spectrum.

To achieve higher angular resolution, some infrared telescopes are combined to form astronomical interferometers. The effective resolution of an interferometer is set by the distance between the telescopes, rather than the size of the individual telescopes. When used together with adaptive optics, infrared interferometers, such as two 10 meter telescopes at Keck Observatory or the four 8.2 meter telescopes that make up the Very Large Telescope Interferometer, can achieve high angular resolution.

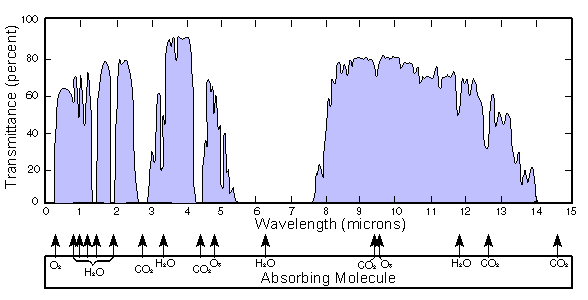
Atmospheric windows in the infrared.

The principal limitation on infrared sensitivity from ground-based telescopes is the Earth's atmosphere. Water vapor absorbs a significant amount of infrared radiation, and the atmosphere itself emits at infrared wavelengths. For this reason, most infrared telescopes are built in very dry places at high altitude, so that they are above most of the water vapor in the atmosphere. Suitable locations on Earth include Mauna Kea Observatory at 4205 meters above sea level, the Paranal Observatory at 2635 meters in Chile and regions of high altitude ice-desert such as Dome C in Antarctic. Even at high altitudes, the transparency of the Earth's atmosphere is limited except in infrared windows, or wavelengths where the Earth's atmosphere is transparent. The main infrared windows are listed below:

Spectrum	Wavelength (micrometres)	Astronomical bands	Telescopes
Near Infrared	0.65 to 1.0	R and I bands	All major optical telescopes
Near Infrared	1.1 to 1.4	J band	Most major optical telescopes and most dedicated infrared telescopes
Near Infrared	1.5 to 1.8	H band	Most major optical telescopes and most dedicated infrared telescopes
Near Infrared	2.0 to 2.4	K band	Most major optical telescopes and most dedicated infrared telescopes
Near Infrared	3.0 to 4.0	L band	Most dedicated infrared telescopes and some optical telescopes
Near Infrared	4.6 to 5.0	M band	Most dedicated infrared telescopes and some optical telescopes
Mid Infrared	7.5 to 14.5	N band	Most dedicated infrared telescopes and some optical telescopes
Mid Infrared	17 to 25	Q band	Some dedicated infrared telescopes and some optical telescopes
Far Infrared	28 to 40	Z band	Some dedicated infrared telescopes and some optical telescopes
Far Infrared	330 to 370		Some dedicated infrared telescopes and some optical telescopes
Far Infrared	450	submillimeter	Submillimeter telescopes

As is the case for visible light telescopes, space is the ideal place for infrared telescopes. Telescopes in space can achieve higher resolution, as they do not suffer from blurring caused by the Earth's atmosphere, and are also free from infrared absorption caused by the Earth's atmosphere. Current infrared telescopes in space include the Herschel Space Observatory, the Spitzer Space Telescope, the Wide-field Infrared Survey Explorer and the James Webb Space Telescope. Since putting telescopes in orbit is expensive, there are also airborne observatories, such as the Stratospheric Observatory for Infrared Astronomy and the Kuiper Airborne Observatory. These observatories fly above most, but not all, of the atmosphere, and water vapor in the atmosphere absorbs some of infrared light from space.

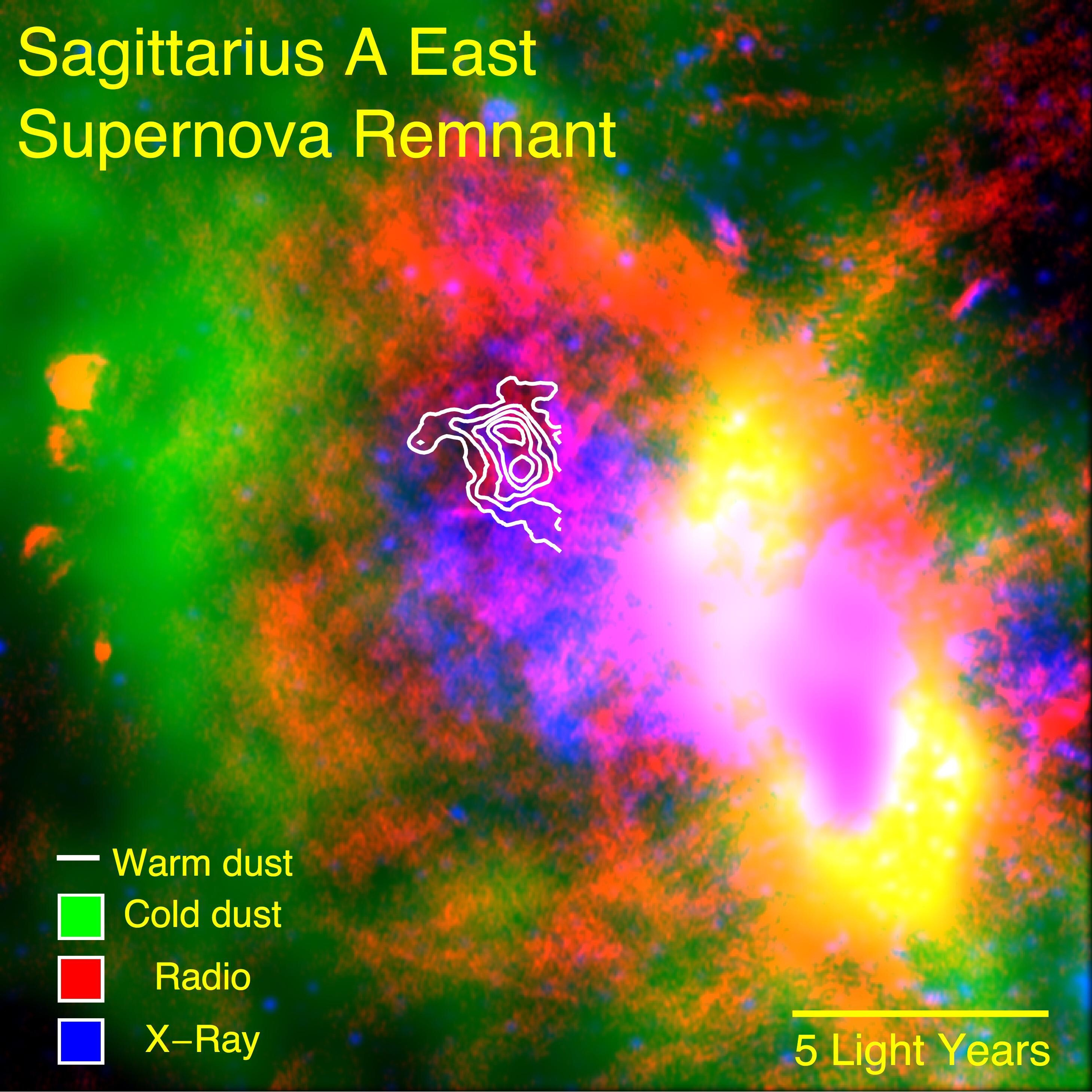
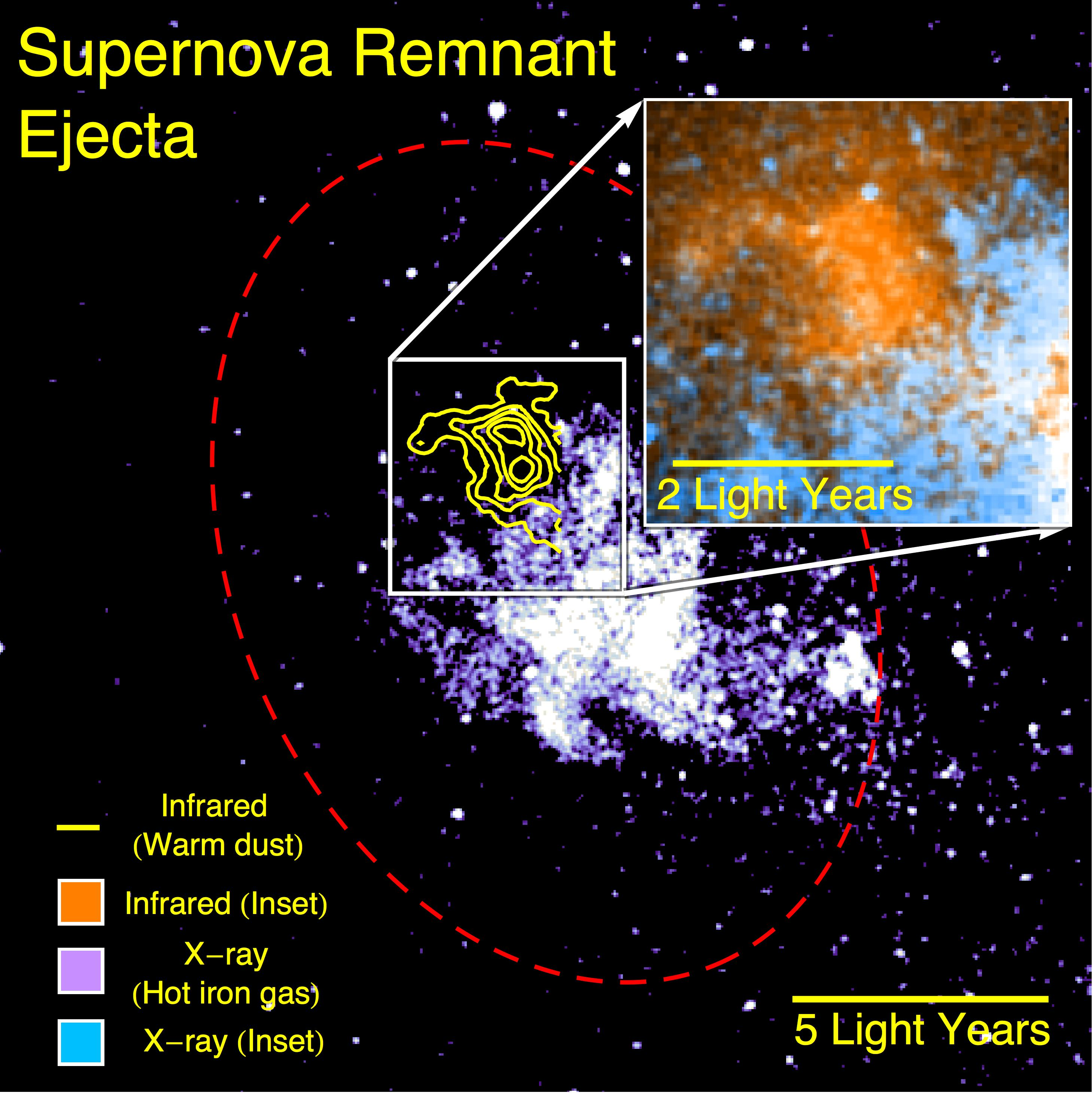
SOFIA science — supernova remnant ejecta producing planet-forming material.

== Infrared technology ==
One of the most common infrared detector arrays used at research telescopes is HgCdTe arrays. These operate well between 0.6 and 5 micrometre wavelengths. For longer wavelength observations or higher sensitivity other detectors may be used, including other narrow gap semiconductor detectors, low temperature bolometer arrays or photon-counting Superconducting Tunnel Junction arrays.

Special requirements for infrared astronomy include: very low dark currents to allow long integration times, associated low noise readout circuits and sometimes very high pixel counts.

Low temperature is often achieved by a coolant, which can run out. Space missions have either ended or shifted to "warm" observations when the coolant supply used up. For example, WISE ran out of coolant in October 2010, about ten months after being launched. (See also NICMOS, Spitzer Space Telescope)

== Observatories ==
=== Space telescopes ===
Many space telescopes detect electromagnetic radiation in a wavelength range that overlaps at least to some degree with the infrared wavelength range. Therefore it is difficult to define which space telescopes are infrared telescopes. Here the definition of "infrared space telescope" is taken to be a space telescope whose main mission is detecting infrared light.

Eleven infrared space telescopes have been operated in space. They are:

- Infrared Astronomical Satellite (IRAS), operated 1983 (10 months). A joint mission of US (NASA), UK and the Netherlands.
- Infrared Space Observatory (ISO), operated 1995–1998, ESA mission.
- Midcourse Space Experiment (MSX), operated 1996–1997, BMDO mission.
- Spitzer Space Telescope, operated 2003–2020, NASA mission.
- Akari, operated 2006–2011, JAXA mission.
- Herschel Space Observatory, operated 2009–2013, ESA mission.
- Wide-field Infrared Survey Explorer (WISE), operated 2009–2024, NASA mission.
- James Webb Space Telescope (JWST), operating 2022–, NASA mission.
- Euclid telescope, operating 2023–, ESA mission.
- SPHEREx telescope, operating 2025–, NASA mission.
- Nancy Grace Roman Space Telescope (NGRST), originally known as the Wide Field InfraRed Space Telescope (WFIRST), operating 2026–, NASA mission.

Many other smaller space-missions and space-based detectors of infrared radiation have been operated in space. These include the Infrared Telescope (IRT) that flew with the Space Shuttle.

The Submillimeter Wave Astronomy Satellite (SWAS) is sometimes mentioned as an infrared satellite, although it is a submillimeter satellite.

==== Infrared instruments on space telescopes ====
For many space telescopes, only some of the instruments are capable of infrared observation. Below are listed some of the most notable of these space observatories and instruments:

- Cosmic Background Explorer (COBE) satellite (1989–1993) Diffuse Infrared Background Experiment (DIRBE) instrument
- Hubble Space Telescope (1990–) Near Infrared Camera and Multi-Object Spectrometer (NICMOS) instrument (1997–1999, 2002–2008)
- Hubble Space Telescope Wide Field Camera 3 (WFC3) camera (2009–) observes infrared.

=== Airborne observatories ===
Three airplane-based observatories have been used (other aircraft have also been used occasionally to host infrared space studies) to study the sky in infrared. They are:

- Galileo Observatory, a NASA mission (1965–1973)
- Kuiper Airborne Observatory, a NASA mission (1974–1995)
- SOFIA, a NASA-DLR mission (2010–2022)

=== Ground-based observatories ===
Many ground-based infrared telescopes exist around the world. The largest are:

- VISTA
- UKIRT
- IRTF
- WIRO

== See also ==
- Far-infrared astronomy
- Infrared spectroscopy
- List of largest infrared telescopes
- Radio Galaxy Zoo
