= Super-channel =

Enhanced DWDM

A super-channel is an evolution in dense wavelength-division multiplexing (DWDM) in which multiple, coherent optical carriers are combined to create a unified channel of a higher data rate, and which is brought into service in a single operational cycle.

== Background ==
From around 2010, coherent optical transmission at 40 Gbit/s and 100 Gbit/s began to be deployed in long-haul optical networks around the world. Coherent technology enables higher data rates to be sent over long haul (typically >2,000 km) optical transmission networks, compared to the historical modulation and detection technique, Intensity Modulation with Direct Detection (sometimes referred to as Non-Return to Zero, NRZ or On/Off Keying, OOK), which had been widely used for several decades.

However, a coherent detector requires that the incoming phase modulation information is digitized before being sent to a high-performance digital signal processor (DSP). Within the DSP, optical impairments such as chromatic dispersion and polarization mode dispersion can be compensated for. Digitizing the received signal requires an extremely high speed analog-to-digital converter (ADC) capability. Current commercially deployed coherent products are limited to 200 Gbit/s per optical carrier.

Going beyond 200 Gbit/s per WDM channel requires the use of multiple carriers to make up a single WDM interface. The resulting multiplex, called a super-channel (or superchannel), creates a multi-wavelength signal in which each wavelength will operate at the maximum data rate permitted by commercially available ADC components.

The primary advantages of a super-channel approach are increased spectral efficiency (a consequence of both coherent detection and the possibility of tight spectral packing of the subcarriers making up a super-channel), and operational scalability (the ability to bring larger units of long haul optical capacity into service for a given operational effort).

== Introduction about super-channels ==
The major difference between superchannel and conventional WDM is the channel gap. Any technique which can reduce the channel gap close to the Nyquist bandwidth (equal signal baud) can be attributed to "superchannel transmission system". These techniques include orthogonal-band-multiplexed (OBM)-orthogonal frequency-division multiplexing (OFDM), no-guard-interval (NGI)-OFDM, Nyquist WDM, multi-channel equalization (MCE)-WDM (also named as Joint ICI Cancellation)

== Examples of super-channels ==
Early work on DWDM super-channels included attempts using multiple laser sources, and wavelength combs generated from a single source – a form of optical orthogonal frequency-division multiplexing (Optical OFDM). The first experimental demonstration of long-haul superchannel transmission, which coined the term `superchannel' for this type of application, was performed by Bell Labs' S. Chandrasekhar and X. Liu in 2009.

The approach being brought to market by companies such as Infinera, Alcatel-Lucent, Huawei and Ciena makes use of multiple laser sources. Infinera is making use of their large scale photonic integrated circuit (PIC) technology, while the other system vendors are building super-channel line cards using predominantly discrete optical components.

The Infinera super-channel solution was first deployed in mid-2012, and consists of a ten-carrier, 500-Gbit/s Polarization Multiplexed Quadrature Phase Shift Keying (PM-QPSK) super-channel implemented on a single line card. Infinera has also demonstrated a ten-carrier PM-16QAM super-channel solution that is intended to fit in the same form factor as the current 500-Gbit/s product. Infinera claims over twenty customer deployments of this technology worldwide.

Nortel (now Ciena) first commercialized a PM-BPSK 50 Gb/s and PM-QPSK 100 Gb/s super-channel transceiver in late 2009. Alcatel-Lucent, Ciena and Huawei have all announced dual carrier, 200-Gbit/s PM-QPSK super-channel designs that can also operate at 400 Gbit/s using a shorter optical reach PM-16QAM modulation. The first commercial deployment of a 400-Gbit/s superchannel used the Alcatel-Lucent 400G Photonic Service Engine (PSE) on an Orange Network.

== Notes and references ==
- S. Chandrasekhar, X. Liu, B. Zhu, and D. Peckham, “Transmission of a 1.2-Tb/s 24-Carrier No-Guard-Interval Coherent OFDM Superchannel over 7200-km of Ultra-Large-Area Fiber”, Post deadline paper PD 2.6, ECOC 2009, Vienna, Austria, September 20–24 (2009).
- Govind P. Agrawal: “Fiber-Optic Communication Systems, 4th Edition.” ISBN 978-0-470-50511-3 (2010).
- Gabriella Bosco et al.: “On the Performance of Nyquist-WDM Terabit Superchannels Based on PM BPSK, PM-QPSK, PM-8QAM or PM-16QAM Subcarriers”. Journal of Lightwave Technology, Vol. 29, No. 1, January 1, 2011.
- W. Shieh, Q. Yang, and Y. Ma, “107 Gb/s coherent optical OFDM transmission over 1000-km SSMF fiber using orthogonal band multiplexing,” Opt Express, 16(9), 6378-6386 (2008), http://www.opticsinfobase.org/oe/fulltext.cfm?uri=oe-16-9-6378&id=157340
- A.Sano, E.Yamada, H.Masuda, E.Yamazaki, T.Kobayashi, E.Yoshida, Y.Miyamoto, R.Kudo, Ko.Ishihara, and Y.Takatori “No-guard-interval coherent optical OFDM for 100-Gbs long-haul WDM transmission,” J. Lightwave Technol. 27, 3705-3713 (2009)
- X.Zhou, L.E.Nelson, P.Magill, R.Isaac, B.Zhu, D.W.Peckham, P.I.Borel, and K.Carlson, “PDM-Nyquist-32QAM for 450-Gb/s per-channel WDM transmission on the 50 GHz ITU-T grid,” J. Lightwave Technol. 30, 553 – 559 (2012)
- C.Liu, J.Pan, T.Detwiler, A.Stark, Y.T.Hsueh G.K.Chang, and S.E.Ralph “Super receiver design for superchannel coherent optical systems,” Proc. SPIE, 8284, 1–8(2012).
- Zeng, Tao. "Superchannel transmission system based on multi-channel equalization." Optics express 21.12 (2013): 14799–14807. http://www.opticsinfobase.org/oe/abstract.cfm?uri=oe-21-12-14799
- Light Reading: “Infinera Claims Top 100G Share”. http://www.lightreading.com/long-haul-wdm-equipment/infinera-claims-top-100g-share/240143572
- Light Reading: "Verizon Switches On 100G in Europe". http://www.lightreading.com/ethernet-ip/verizon-switches-on-100g-in-europe/d/d-id/673196
- Light Reading: "Huawei Unveils New WDM Prototype". http://www.lightreading.com/optical-equipment/huawei-unveils-new-wdm-prototype/240140353
- Light Reading: "AlcaLu Claims 400G is Hot". http://www.lightreading.com/optical-equipment/alcalu-claims-400g-is-hot/240140479
- Light Reading: "Beyond 100G: Optical Vendors Push for 400G". http://www.lightreading.com/beyond-100g-optical-vendors-push-for-400g/240145009
- Alcatel-Lucent's 400G PSE super-channel product, commercially available since 2013. https://www.alcatel-lucent.com/innovation/400g-pse
