= Frequency grid =

For telecommunications, a frequency grid is a table of all the central frequencies (and corresponding wavelengths) of channels allowed in a communications system.

The most common frequency grid used for fiber-optic communication is that used for channel spacing in Dense Wavelength Division Multiplexing (DWDM) at wavelengths around 1550 nm and defined by ITU-T G.694.1. The grid is defined relative to 193.1 THz and extends from 191.7 THz to 196.1 THz with 100 GHz spacing. While defined in frequency, the grid is often expressed in terms of wavelength, in which case it covers the wavelength range of 1528.77 nm to 1563.86 nm with approximately a 0.8 nm channel spacing.

For practical purposes, the grid has been extended to cover 186 THz to 201 THz and subdivided to provide 50 GHz and 25 GHz spaced grids.
