= Super! Drama TV =

- Type: Satellite and cable television network
- Country: Japan
- Headquarters: Tokyo

Programming
- Language: Japanese
- Picture format: HDTV 1080i

Ownership
- Owner: Tohokushinsha Media Service

History
- Launched: 1 September 1989; 37 years ago
- Closed: 30 June 2026; 3 months ago
- Former names: Super Channel (1989–2006)

Links
- Website: www.superdramatv.com (in Japanese)

Super! Drama TV (formerly known as Super Channel) was a Japanese satellite television channel owned by Tohokushinsha Media Service, a subsidiary of Tohokushinsha.

One of the oldest Japanese cable and satellite networks, it specialized mostly in foreign series, usually American. The channel closed on June 30, 2026.

== History ==
Super Channel started broadcasting in 1989, owned by Japan Image Vision. By March 1992, ownership had transferred to Super Channel Enterprises, and was being offered for 270,000 yen per subscription. For most of its early existence, the bulk of its programming came from overseas. In 1996, the channel started airing Venezuelan telenovelas produced by Coral International; Tohokushinsha was in charge of eventually distributing its series to terrestrial TV. In April 1997, it signed up for carriage on DirecTV Japan; back then it was already present on rival operator PerfecTV!.

The channel was renamed Super! Drama TV in 2006. As of March 2015, the channel had 8,153,100 subscribers and was specializing more in drama series, mostly American. Some Scandinavian drama series were already airing by then, such as The Killing, The Bridge and Borgen. 57% of its subscriber base was female; housewives alone being the main target demographic.

The channel was removed from J:COM on September 30, 2023.

On March 19, 2026, it announced its closure at midnight on June 30 of the same year due to "various circumstances related to the business environment", without specifying them. In the case of series airing new episodes, the channel planned to air their current seasons up until the final episode prior to the closing date. The physical channel slot on SKY PerfecTV! will be taken over by V Paradise after that date.
