= Muxponder =

Element that sends and receives the optical signal on a fiber

In fiber-optic communications, a muxponder is the element that sends and receives the optical signal on a fiber in much the same way as a transponder except that the muxponder has the additional functionality of multiplexing multiple sub-rate client interfaces onto the line interface.
