= L band (infrared) =

L-band is a name used for a fixed range of infrared frequencies. The definition of the range depends on the application, with different bands used for fibre-optic communications and astronomy.

== Fibre-optic telecommunications ==
Absorption in fiber in the range 900–1700 nm

In infrared optical communications, L-band refers to the wavelength range 1565–1625 nm. The L-band is located next to the conventional (C) band (1530–1565 nm).

== Infrared astronomy ==
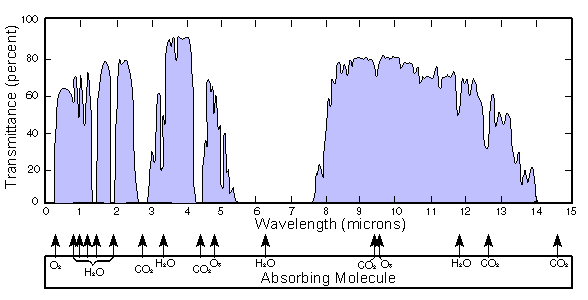
Atmospheric windows in the infrared. The L band is the transmission window centred on 3.5 micrometres

In infrared astronomy, the L band is an atmospheric transmission window centred on 3.5 micrometres (in the mid-infrared).
