= M band (infrared) =

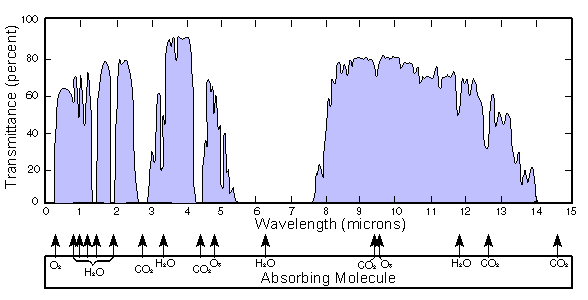
Atmospheric windows in the infrared. The M band is the transmission window centred on 4.7 micrometres

In infrared astronomy, the M band is an atmospheric transmission window centered on 4.8 micrometres (in the mid-infrared).
