= N band =

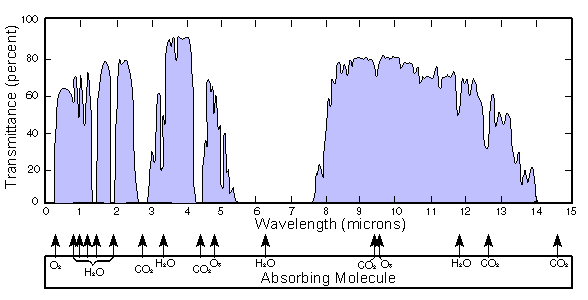
Atmospheric windows in the infrared. The N band is the transmission window centred on 10 micrometres

In infrared astronomy, the N band refers to an atmospheric transmission window centred on 10 micrometres (in the mid-infrared).
